This is a partial list of unnumbered minor planets for principal provisional designations assigned between 1 June and 31 July 2002. , a total of 475 bodies remain unnumbered for this period. Objects for this year are listed on the following pages: A–B · C · D–F · G–K · L–O · P · Qi · Qii · Ri · Rii · S · Ti · Tii · U–V and W–Y. Also see previous and next year.

L 

|- id="2002 LK" bgcolor=#FFC2E0
| 6 || 2002 LK || APO || 24.2 || data-sort-value="0.051" | 51 m || single || 6 days || 08 Jun 2002 || 66 || align=left | Disc.: KLENOT || 
|- id="2002 LN" bgcolor=#FA8072
| 2 || 2002 LN || MCA || 18.5 || 1.1 km || multiple || 2002–2018 || 08 Sep 2018 || 22 || align=left | Disc.: NEATAdded on 9 March 2021Alt.: 2018 LQ || 
|- id="2002 LW" bgcolor=#FFC2E0
| 3 || 2002 LW || APO || 22.4 || data-sort-value="0.12" | 120 m || multiple || 2002–2005 || 25 Dec 2005 || 64 || align=left | Disc.: NEAT || 
|- id="2002 LX" bgcolor=#FFC2E0
| 0 || 2002 LX || APO || 21.22 || data-sort-value="0.20" | 200 m || multiple || 2002–2022 || 25 Jan 2022 || 122 || align=left | Disc.: LINEARPotentially hazardous object || 
|- id="2002 LY1" bgcolor=#FFC2E0
| 1 ||  || ATE || 22.3 || data-sort-value="0.12" | 120 m || multiple || 2002–2016 || 12 Jun 2016 || 171 || align=left | Disc.: NEAT || 
|- id="2002 LH2" bgcolor=#E9E9E9
| 2 ||  || MBA-M || 18.4 || data-sort-value="0.62" | 620 m || multiple || 2002–2018 || 10 Jul 2018 || 51 || align=left | Disc.: LPL/Spacewatch IIAlt.: 2018 LS10 || 
|- id="2002 LU2" bgcolor=#E9E9E9
| 2 ||  || MBA-M || 17.2 || 1.5 km || multiple || 2002–2019 || 04 Jul 2019 || 51 || align=left | Disc.: LPL/Spacewatch II || 
|- id="2002 LZ2" bgcolor=#fefefe
| 0 ||  || MBA-I || 18.67 || data-sort-value="0.55" | 550 m || multiple || 2002–2021 || 11 Nov 2021 || 46 || align=left | Disc.: LPL/Spacewatch IIAdded on 22 July 2020 || 
|- id="2002 LD3" bgcolor=#fefefe
| 0 ||  || MBA-I || 17.6 || data-sort-value="0.90" | 900 m || multiple || 2002–2020 || 14 Jul 2020 || 105 || align=left | Disc.: LPL/Spacewatch II || 
|- id="2002 LG3" bgcolor=#FFC2E0
| 0 ||  || APO || 19.9 || data-sort-value="0.37" | 370 m || multiple || 2002–2021 || 11 Jan 2021 || 131 || align=left | Disc.: LONEOS || 
|- id="2002 LH3" bgcolor=#FFC2E0
| 1 ||  || AMO || 20.3 || data-sort-value="0.31" | 310 m || multiple || 2002–2005 || 11 Jul 2005 || 77 || align=left | Disc.: LINEAR || 
|- id="2002 LS5" bgcolor=#FA8072
| 1 ||  || MCA || 18.2 || data-sort-value="0.68" | 680 m || multiple || 2002–2019 || 27 Oct 2019 || 120 || align=left | Disc.: LINEAR || 
|- id="2002 LM24" bgcolor=#E9E9E9
| 1 ||  || MBA-M || 16.3 || 1.6 km || multiple || 2002–2021 || 18 Jan 2021 || 89 || align=left | Disc.: NEATAlt.: 2015 XY189 || 
|- id="2002 LO24" bgcolor=#E9E9E9
| 0 ||  || MBA-M || 17.20 || 2.0 km || multiple || 2002–2021 || 06 Nov 2021 || 79 || align=left | Disc.: NEATAdded on 22 July 2020 || 
|- id="2002 LR24" bgcolor=#FFC2E0
| 7 ||  || APO || 24.3 || data-sort-value="0.049" | 49 m || single || 7 days || 15 Jun 2002 || 41 || align=left | Disc.: LINEAR || 
|- id="2002 LS24" bgcolor=#FFC2E0
| 5 ||  || APO || 22.1 || data-sort-value="0.14" | 140 m || single || 114 days || 30 Sep 2002 || 34 || align=left | Disc.: AMOSAMO at MPC || 
|- id="2002 LC26" bgcolor=#E9E9E9
| 0 ||  || MBA-M || 16.82 || 2.4 km || multiple || 2002–2021 || 29 Nov 2021 || 120 || align=left | Disc.: LINEAR || 
|- id="2002 LJ27" bgcolor=#FFE699
| 6 ||  || Asteroid || 18.1 || 1.3 km || single || 25 days || 03 Jul 2002 || 35 || align=left | Disc.: LINEARMCA at MPC || 
|- id="2002 LD31" bgcolor=#FFC2E0
| 6 ||  || AMO || 21.2 || data-sort-value="0.20" | 200 m || single || 52 days || 30 Jul 2002 || 22 || align=left | Disc.: LINEAR || 
|- id="2002 LE31" bgcolor=#FFC2E0
| 1 ||  || APO || 20.1 || data-sort-value="0.34" | 340 m || multiple || 2002–2019 || 08 Aug 2019 || 126 || align=left | Disc.: LONEOSAlt.: 2016 AJ131 || 
|- id="2002 LY33" bgcolor=#fefefe
| 2 ||  || MBA-I || 18.0 || data-sort-value="0.90" | 750 m || multiple || 2002-2022 || 25 Mar 2022 || 42 || align=left | Disc.: NEAT || 
|- id="2002 LU38" bgcolor=#FA8072
| 1 ||  || MCA || 16.7 || 1.9 km || multiple || 2002–2021 || 16 Jan 2021 || 122 || align=left | Disc.: LONEOS || 
|- id="2002 LB39" bgcolor=#FA8072
| 0 ||  || MCA || 18.26 || data-sort-value="0.66" | 660 m || multiple || 2002–2022 || 08 Jan 2022 || 75 || align=left | Disc.: LINEARAlt.: 2016 QT15 || 
|- id="2002 LZ45" bgcolor=#FFC2E0
| 5 ||  || APO || 23.0 || data-sort-value="0.089" | 89 m || single || 10 days || 24 Jun 2002 || 125 || align=left | Disc.: LINEAR || 
|- id="2002 LC48" bgcolor=#E9E9E9
| 0 ||  || MBA-M || 16.6 || 1.4 km || multiple || 2002–2021 || 13 Jan 2021 || 285 || align=left | Disc.: NEATAlt.: 2006 LU6, 2010 JV83 || 
|- id="2002 LF48" bgcolor=#d6d6d6
| 2 ||  || MBA-O || 16.9 || 2.3 km || multiple || 2002–2018 || 11 Jun 2018 || 37 || align=left | Disc.: LPL/Spacewatch II || 
|- id="2002 LA49" bgcolor=#FA8072
| 1 ||  || MCA || 17.4 || 1.4 km || multiple || 2002–2019 || 08 Apr 2019 || 54 || align=left | Disc.: LINEAR || 
|- id="2002 LF55" bgcolor=#E9E9E9
| 2 ||  || MBA-M || 18.2 || data-sort-value="0.96" | 960 m || multiple || 2002–2019 || 07 Apr 2019 || 21 || align=left | Disc.: LPL/Spacewatch II || 
|- id="2002 LM56" bgcolor=#fefefe
| 0 ||  || MBA-I || 18.0 || data-sort-value="0.75" | 750 m || multiple || 2002–2020 || 21 Jul 2020 || 92 || align=left | Disc.: AMOSAlt.: 2013 QN58 || 
|- id="2002 LL61" bgcolor=#d6d6d6
| 0 ||  || MBA-O || 17.0 || 2.2 km || multiple || 2002–2021 || 06 Jun 2021 || 71 || align=left | Disc.: NEATAlt.: 2012 MP14 || 
|- id="2002 LG62" bgcolor=#FA8072
| 0 ||  || MCA || 17.6 || 1.7 km || multiple || 2002–2017 || 11 Dec 2017 || 85 || align=left | Disc.: NEATAlt.: 2013 AB20 || 
|- id="2002 LR62" bgcolor=#E9E9E9
| 0 ||  || MBA-M || 17.8 || data-sort-value="0.82" | 820 m || multiple || 2002–2019 || 28 Nov 2019 || 104 || align=left | Disc.: NEAT || 
|- id="2002 LT62" bgcolor=#E9E9E9
| 0 ||  || MBA-M || 17.46 || data-sort-value="0.96" | 960 m || multiple || 2002–2021 || 12 Feb 2021 || 81 || align=left | Disc.: NEAT || 
|- id="2002 LY62" bgcolor=#d6d6d6
| 0 ||  || MBA-O || 16.52 || 2.8 km || multiple || 2002–2021 || 15 Apr 2021 || 181 || align=left | Disc.: NEAT || 
|- id="2002 LD63" bgcolor=#FA8072
| 0 ||  || MCA || 18.55 || data-sort-value="0.58" | 580 m || multiple || 2002–2021 || 29 Nov 2021 || 64 || align=left | Disc.: NEAT || 
|- id="2002 LF63" bgcolor=#E9E9E9
| 0 ||  || MBA-M || 16.9 || 1.2 km || multiple || 2002–2021 || 24 Jan 2021 || 66 || align=left | Disc.: NEAT || 
|- id="2002 LG63" bgcolor=#fefefe
| 0 ||  || MBA-I || 18.3 || data-sort-value="0.65" | 650 m || multiple || 2002–2019 || 02 Oct 2019 || 59 || align=left | Disc.: NEAT || 
|- id="2002 LH63" bgcolor=#E9E9E9
| 0 ||  || MBA-M || 18.0 || data-sort-value="0.75" | 750 m || multiple || 2002–2019 || 27 Oct 2019 || 59 || align=left | Disc.: NEAT || 
|- id="2002 LN63" bgcolor=#E9E9E9
| 0 ||  || MBA-M || 16.6 || 2.7 km || multiple || 2002–2020 || 24 Mar 2020 || 107 || align=left | Disc.: NEATAlt.: 2015 BG476 || 
|- id="2002 LS63" bgcolor=#fefefe
| 0 ||  || MBA-I || 17.6 || data-sort-value="0.90" | 900 m || multiple || 2002–2020 || 13 Sep 2020 || 151 || align=left | Disc.: NEAT || 
|- id="2002 LT63" bgcolor=#E9E9E9
| 0 ||  || MBA-M || 17.1 || 1.6 km || multiple || 2002–2020 || 16 Oct 2020 || 83 || align=left | Disc.: NEAT || 
|- id="2002 LU63" bgcolor=#fefefe
| 0 ||  || MBA-I || 17.25 || 1.1 km || multiple || 2000–2021 || 06 May 2021 || 133 || align=left | Disc.: NEATAlt.: 2017 DL58 || 
|- id="2002 LV63" bgcolor=#d6d6d6
| 0 ||  || MBA-O || 16.9 || 2.3 km || multiple || 2002–2020 || 18 Oct 2020 || 51 || align=left | Disc.: NEATAdded on 17 June 2021 || 
|- id="2002 LY63" bgcolor=#E9E9E9
| 0 ||  || MBA-M || 17.09 || 1.6 km || multiple || 2002–2021 || 05 Dec 2021 || 166 || align=left | Disc.: NEAT || 
|- id="2002 LA64" bgcolor=#E9E9E9
| 0 ||  || MBA-M || 17.3 || 1.0 km || multiple || 2002–2019 || 16 Dec 2019 || 165 || align=left | Disc.: NEAT || 
|- id="2002 LC64" bgcolor=#fefefe
| 0 ||  || MBA-I || 17.9 || data-sort-value="0.78" | 780 m || multiple || 2002–2020 || 18 Jul 2020 || 128 || align=left | Disc.: NEAT || 
|- id="2002 LE64" bgcolor=#fefefe
| 0 ||  || MBA-I || 18.4 || data-sort-value="0.62" | 620 m || multiple || 2002–2021 || 09 Jun 2021 || 90 || align=left | Disc.: NEATAlt.: 2015 NQ19 || 
|- id="2002 LF64" bgcolor=#E9E9E9
| 0 ||  || MBA-M || 17.2 || 1.1 km || multiple || 2002–2021 || 23 Jan 2021 || 65 || align=left | Disc.: NEAT || 
|- id="2002 LG64" bgcolor=#E9E9E9
| 0 ||  || MBA-M || 16.32 || 3.0 km || multiple || 2002–2021 || 28 Oct 2021 || 339 || align=left | Disc.: NEATAlt.: 2006 DJ199, 2011 JO30 || 
|- id="2002 LH64" bgcolor=#fefefe
| 1 ||  || MBA-I || 18.0 || data-sort-value="0.75" | 750 m || multiple || 2002–2020 || 09 Dec 2020 || 58 || align=left | Disc.: NEAT || 
|- id="2002 LK64" bgcolor=#E9E9E9
| 2 ||  || MBA-M || 17.3 || 1.5 km || multiple || 1998–2019 || 04 Oct 2019 || 165 || align=left | Disc.: NEAT || 
|- id="2002 LM64" bgcolor=#E9E9E9
| 0 ||  || MBA-M || 17.3 || 1.0 km || multiple || 2002–2020 || 22 Jan 2020 || 100 || align=left | Disc.: NEAT || 
|- id="2002 LO64" bgcolor=#fefefe
| 0 ||  || MBA-I || 17.6 || data-sort-value="0.90" | 900 m || multiple || 2002–2021 || 18 Jan 2021 || 146 || align=left | Disc.: NEATAlt.: 2008 DF18 || 
|- id="2002 LR64" bgcolor=#E9E9E9
| 0 ||  || MBA-M || 17.1 || 1.1 km || multiple || 2002–2020 || 23 Jan 2020 || 96 || align=left | Disc.: NEAT || 
|- id="2002 LW64" bgcolor=#E9E9E9
| 0 ||  || MBA-M || 16.3 || 1.6 km || multiple || 2002–2021 || 15 Jan 2021 || 249 || align=left | Disc.: NEATAlt.: 2015 XA159 || 
|- id="2002 LX64" bgcolor=#FFC2E0
| 1 ||  || APO || 21.2 || data-sort-value="0.20" | 200 m || multiple || 2002–2021 || 14 Jun 2021 || 107 || align=left | Disc.: NEATPotentially hazardous objectAlt.: 2017 UY42 || 
|- id="2002 LA65" bgcolor=#fefefe
| 0 ||  || MBA-I || 17.61 || 1.1 km || multiple || 2002–2021 || 04 Aug 2021 || 118 || align=left | Disc.: NEATAlt.: 2006 LV5, 2010 LJ38 || 
|- id="2002 LE65" bgcolor=#E9E9E9
| 0 ||  || MBA-M || 17.03 || 2.2 km || multiple || 2002–2022 || 04 Jan 2022 || 96 || align=left | Disc.: NEATAlt.: 2016 SW7 || 
|- id="2002 LF65" bgcolor=#E9E9E9
| 0 ||  || MBA-M || 16.9 || 1.2 km || multiple || 1998–2021 || 21 Jan 2021 || 115 || align=left | Disc.: LINEARAlt.: 1998 RM13 || 
|- id="2002 LG65" bgcolor=#d6d6d6
| 0 ||  || MBA-O || 16.1 || 3.4 km || multiple || 2002–2021 || 11 Jan 2021 || 97 || align=left | Disc.: NEAT || 
|- id="2002 LJ65" bgcolor=#E9E9E9
| 0 ||  || MBA-M || 16.9 || 1.8 km || multiple || 2002–2020 || 19 Nov 2020 || 129 || align=left | Disc.: NEAT || 
|- id="2002 LL65" bgcolor=#d6d6d6
| 0 ||  || MBA-O || 16.3 || 3.1 km || multiple || 2002–2019 || 24 Oct 2019 || 101 || align=left | Disc.: NEAT || 
|- id="2002 LO65" bgcolor=#fefefe
| 0 ||  || MBA-I || 18.4 || data-sort-value="0.62" | 620 m || multiple || 2002–2019 || 19 Sep 2019 || 50 || align=left | Disc.: NEATAlt.: 2005 GH39 || 
|- id="2002 LQ65" bgcolor=#fefefe
| 0 ||  || MBA-I || 18.1 || data-sort-value="0.71" | 710 m || multiple || 2002–2017 || 16 Nov 2017 || 76 || align=left | Disc.: LPL/Spacewatch II || 
|- id="2002 LR65" bgcolor=#fefefe
| 0 ||  || MBA-I || 17.6 || data-sort-value="0.90" | 900 m || multiple || 2002–2020 || 22 Sep 2020 || 109 || align=left | Disc.: NEAT || 
|- id="2002 LT65" bgcolor=#E9E9E9
| 0 ||  || MBA-M || 17.4 || data-sort-value="0.98" | 980 m || multiple || 2002–2020 || 16 Dec 2020 || 80 || align=left | Disc.: LPL/Spacewatch II || 
|- id="2002 LV65" bgcolor=#d6d6d6
| 0 ||  || MBA-O || 16.3 || 3.1 km || multiple || 2002–2020 || 18 Oct 2020 || 65 || align=left | Disc.: LPL/Spacewatch II || 
|- id="2002 LW65" bgcolor=#fefefe
| 0 ||  || MBA-I || 18.6 || data-sort-value="0.57" | 570 m || multiple || 2002–2017 || 14 Dec 2017 || 39 || align=left | Disc.: La Silla Obs. || 
|- id="2002 LX65" bgcolor=#fefefe
| 0 ||  || MBA-I || 18.7 || data-sort-value="0.54" | 540 m || multiple || 2002–2020 || 22 Jun 2020 || 79 || align=left | Disc.: LPL/Spacewatch II || 
|- id="2002 LZ65" bgcolor=#d6d6d6
| 0 ||  || MBA-O || 16.8 || 2.4 km || multiple || 2002–2019 || 24 Oct 2019 || 62 || align=left | Disc.: NEAT || 
|- id="2002 LA66" bgcolor=#d6d6d6
| 0 ||  || MBA-O || 16.84 || 2.4 km || multiple || 2002–2022 || 26 Jan 2022 || 78 || align=left | Disc.: LPL/Spacewatch II || 
|- id="2002 LC66" bgcolor=#E9E9E9
| 1 ||  || MBA-M || 18.4 || data-sort-value="0.62" | 620 m || multiple || 2002–2019 || 06 Sep 2019 || 53 || align=left | Disc.: LPL/Spacewatch II || 
|- id="2002 LD66" bgcolor=#fefefe
| 0 ||  || MBA-I || 18.23 || data-sort-value="0.67" | 670 m || multiple || 2002–2021 || 15 Apr 2021 || 69 || align=left | Disc.: LPL/Spacewatch II || 
|- id="2002 LE66" bgcolor=#E9E9E9
| 0 ||  || MBA-M || 18.0 || data-sort-value="0.75" | 750 m || multiple || 2002–2019 || 24 Aug 2019 || 50 || align=left | Disc.: LPL/Spacewatch II || 
|- id="2002 LF66" bgcolor=#d6d6d6
| 0 ||  || MBA-O || 17.23 || 2.0 km || multiple || 2002–2021 || 11 May 2021 || 48 || align=left | Disc.: LPL/Spacewatch II || 
|- id="2002 LG66" bgcolor=#d6d6d6
| 0 ||  || MBA-O || 16.8 || 2.4 km || multiple || 2002–2019 || 28 Dec 2019 || 43 || align=left | Disc.: LPL/Spacewatch II || 
|- id="2002 LH66" bgcolor=#fefefe
| 0 ||  || MBA-I || 18.87 || data-sort-value="0.50" | 500 m || multiple || 2002–2021 || 15 Apr 2021 || 46 || align=left | Disc.: LPL/Spacewatch II || 
|- id="2002 LJ66" bgcolor=#d6d6d6
| 0 ||  || MBA-O || 16.4 || 2.9 km || multiple || 2002–2020 || 15 Oct 2020 || 78 || align=left | Disc.: NEAT || 
|- id="2002 LK66" bgcolor=#fefefe
| 0 ||  || MBA-I || 19.3 || data-sort-value="0.41" | 410 m || multiple || 2002–2019 || 28 Aug 2019 || 63 || align=left | Disc.: La Silla Obs. || 
|- id="2002 LL66" bgcolor=#d6d6d6
| 0 ||  || MBA-O || 16.3 || 3.1 km || multiple || 2002–2020 || 11 Nov 2020 || 87 || align=left | Disc.: NEAT || 
|- id="2002 LM66" bgcolor=#E9E9E9
| 0 ||  || MBA-M || 18.1 || data-sort-value="0.71" | 710 m || multiple || 2002–2019 || 25 Sep 2019 || 32 || align=left | Disc.: LPL/Spacewatch II || 
|- id="2002 LN66" bgcolor=#fefefe
| 0 ||  || MBA-I || 18.5 || data-sort-value="0.59" | 590 m || multiple || 2002–2020 || 16 Oct 2020 || 94 || align=left | Disc.: LPL/Spacewatch II || 
|- id="2002 LO66" bgcolor=#d6d6d6
| 0 ||  || MBA-O || 16.9 || 2.3 km || multiple || 2002–2020 || 03 Jan 2020 || 44 || align=left | Disc.: La Silla Obs. || 
|- id="2002 LP66" bgcolor=#fefefe
| 0 ||  || MBA-I || 18.0 || data-sort-value="0.75" | 750 m || multiple || 2002–2018 || 17 Nov 2018 || 39 || align=left | Disc.: LPL/Spacewatch II || 
|}
back to top

M 

|- id="2002 MN" bgcolor=#FFC2E0
| 6 || 2002 MN || APO || 23.6 || data-sort-value="0.068" | 68 m || single || 53 days || 09 Aug 2002 || 83 || align=left | Disc.: LINEAR || 
|- id="2002 MQ" bgcolor=#FA8072
| 0 || 2002 MQ || MCA || 17.9 || 1.1 km || multiple || 2002–2020 || 14 Nov 2020 || 84 || align=left | Disc.: CINEOS || 
|- id="2002 MU" bgcolor=#d6d6d6
| 0 || 2002 MU || MBA-O || 16.7 || 2.5 km || multiple || 2002–2020 || 14 Nov 2020 || 29 || align=left | Disc.: LPL/Spacewatch IIAdded on 9 March 2021 || 
|- id="2002 MV" bgcolor=#d6d6d6
| 0 || 2002 MV || MBA-O || 17.62 || 1.7 km || multiple || 2002–2021 || 06 Jun 2021 || 52 || align=left | Disc.: LPL/Spacewatch II || 
|- id="2002 MX" bgcolor=#FFC2E0
| 4 || 2002 MX || APO || 21.7 || data-sort-value="0.16" | 160 m || single || 19 days || 05 Jul 2002 || 32 || align=left | Disc.: LINEARPotentially hazardous object || 
|- id="2002 MY" bgcolor=#FFC2E0
| 1 || 2002 MY || AMO || 22.5 || data-sort-value="0.11" | 110 m || multiple || 2002–2019 || 14 Jun 2019 || 84 || align=left | Disc.: LINEAR || 
|- id="2002 MP1" bgcolor=#FA8072
| 0 ||  || MCA || 18.99 || data-sort-value="0.47" | 470 m || multiple || 2002–2020 || 16 Oct 2020 || 83 || align=left | Disc.: LINEAR || 
|- id="2002 MT1" bgcolor=#FFC2E0
| 1 ||  || AMO || 21.2 || data-sort-value="0.20" | 200 m || multiple || 2002–2013 || 11 Oct 2013 || 68 || align=left | Disc.: NEAT || 
|- id="2002 MO3" bgcolor=#fefefe
| 0 ||  || MBA-I || 16.86 || 1.3 km || multiple || 2002–2021 || 30 Aug 2021 || 201 || align=left | Disc.: NEAT || 
|- id="2002 MR3" bgcolor=#FFC2E0
| 8 ||  || APO || 21.4 || data-sort-value="0.19" | 190 m || single || 8 days || 07 Jul 2002 || 78 || align=left | Disc.: LINEARPotentially hazardous object || 
|- id="2002 MS3" bgcolor=#FFC2E0
| 0 ||  || APO || 19.25 || data-sort-value="0.50" | 500 m || multiple || 2002–2013 || 11 Dec 2013 || 128 || align=left | Disc.: NEAT || 
|- id="2002 MT3" bgcolor=#FFC2E0
| 6 ||  || APO || 19.9 || data-sort-value="0.37" | 370 m || single || 31 days || 31 Jul 2002 || 66 || align=left | Disc.: NEATPotentially hazardous object || 
|- id="2002 MF4" bgcolor=#E9E9E9
| 0 ||  || MBA-M || 17.02 || 1.2 km || multiple || 2002–2021 || 01 May 2021 || 56 || align=left | Disc.: La Palma Obs.Alt.: 2011 WE31 || 
|- id="2002 MH4" bgcolor=#E9E9E9
| 0 ||  || MBA-M || 17.9 || 1.5 km || multiple || 2002–2020 || 11 Aug 2020 || 91 || align=left | Disc.: La Palma Obs.Added on 22 July 2020Alt.: 2015 FN381 || 
|- id="2002 MP4" bgcolor=#d6d6d6
| 0 ||  || MBA-O || 16.32 || 3.0 km || multiple || 2002–2022 || 25 Jan 2022 || 97 || align=left | Disc.: La Palma Obs. || 
|- id="2002 ML5" bgcolor=#fefefe
| 0 ||  || MBA-I || 18.0 || data-sort-value="0.75" | 750 m || multiple || 2002–2019 || 19 Sep 2019 || 102 || align=left | Disc.: NEATAlt.: 2012 HK72 || 
|- id="2002 MU5" bgcolor=#fefefe
| 0 ||  || MBA-I || 17.7 || data-sort-value="0.86" | 860 m || multiple || 1995–2021 || 06 Jan 2021 || 205 || align=left | Disc.: NEAT || 
|- id="2002 MX5" bgcolor=#E9E9E9
| 0 ||  || MBA-M || 16.1 || 2.5 km || multiple || 2002–2021 || 21 Jan 2021 || 370 || align=left | Disc.: NEAT || 
|- id="2002 MA6" bgcolor=#E9E9E9
| 2 ||  || MBA-M || 17.5 || data-sort-value="0.94" | 940 m || multiple || 2002–2020 || 23 Jan 2020 || 65 || align=left | Disc.: NEAT || 
|- id="2002 MD6" bgcolor=#fefefe
| 0 ||  || MBA-I || 18.3 || data-sort-value="0.65" | 650 m || multiple || 1999–2019 || 28 Oct 2019 || 103 || align=left | Disc.: NEATAlt.: 2009 TT48 || 
|- id="2002 MM6" bgcolor=#E9E9E9
| 0 ||  || MBA-M || 17.2 || 2.0 km || multiple || 2002–2020 || 15 Jun 2020 || 77 || align=left | Disc.: NEAT || 
|- id="2002 MN6" bgcolor=#E9E9E9
| 0 ||  || MBA-M || 16.66 || 2.6 km || multiple || 2002–2021 || 25 Nov 2021 || 190 || align=left | Disc.: NEATAlt.: 2005 CU80 || 
|- id="2002 MO6" bgcolor=#E9E9E9
| 0 ||  || MBA-M || 17.02 || 1.2 km || multiple || 2000–2021 || 08 May 2021 || 108 || align=left | Disc.: NEAT || 
|- id="2002 MY6" bgcolor=#d6d6d6
| 0 ||  || MBA-O || 16.8 || 2.4 km || multiple || 2002–2018 || 13 Sep 2018 || 64 || align=left | Disc.: NEAT || 
|- id="2002 MZ6" bgcolor=#E9E9E9
| 1 ||  || MBA-M || 17.4 || 1.4 km || multiple || 2002–2020 || 23 Oct 2020 || 58 || align=left | Disc.: NEAT || 
|- id="2002 MA7" bgcolor=#fefefe
| 0 ||  || MBA-I || 18.3 || data-sort-value="0.65" | 650 m || multiple || 2002–2019 || 25 Oct 2019 || 76 || align=left | Disc.: NEAT || 
|- id="2002 MB7" bgcolor=#E9E9E9
| 0 ||  || MBA-M || 17.04 || 1.2 km || multiple || 2002–2021 || 15 Apr 2021 || 52 || align=left | Disc.: NEAT || 
|- id="2002 MF7" bgcolor=#E9E9E9
| 1 ||  || MBA-M || 17.3 || 1.0 km || multiple || 2002–2021 || 18 Jan 2021 || 77 || align=left | Disc.: NEAT || 
|- id="2002 MH7" bgcolor=#fefefe
| 5 ||  || MBA-I || 19.1 || data-sort-value="0.45" | 450 m || single || 65 days || 29 Aug 2002 || 22 || align=left | Disc.: NEAT || 
|- id="2002 MJ7" bgcolor=#E9E9E9
| 0 ||  || MBA-M || 17.38 || 1.9 km || multiple || 2002–2021 || 02 Dec 2021 || 174 || align=left | Disc.: NEATAlt.: 2009 BH19 || 
|- id="2002 MQ7" bgcolor=#E9E9E9
| 0 ||  || MBA-M || 16.69 || 1.4 km || multiple || 2002–2021 || 12 May 2021 || 229 || align=left | Disc.: NEATAlt.: 2004 BL14 || 
|- id="2002 MR7" bgcolor=#E9E9E9
| 1 ||  || MBA-M || 18.1 || data-sort-value="0.71" | 710 m || multiple || 2002–2019 || 03 Dec 2019 || 63 || align=left | Disc.: NEAT || 
|- id="2002 MS7" bgcolor=#E9E9E9
| 1 ||  || MBA-M || 18.5 || data-sort-value="0.84" | 840 m || multiple || 2002–2015 || 03 Nov 2015 || 68 || align=left | Disc.: NEAT || 
|- id="2002 MT7" bgcolor=#FA8072
| 0 ||  || MCA || 19.42 || data-sort-value="0.39" | 390 m || multiple || 2002–2021 || 14 Nov 2021 || 67 || align=left | Disc.: NEAT || 
|- id="2002 MX7" bgcolor=#d6d6d6
| 0 ||  || MBA-O || 15.8 || 3.9 km || multiple || 2000–2021 || 17 Jan 2021 || 181 || align=left | Disc.: NEATAlt.: 2008 SJ292, 2014 VU || 
|- id="2002 MY7" bgcolor=#fefefe
| 0 ||  || MBA-I || 18.1 || data-sort-value="0.71" | 710 m || multiple || 2002–2019 || 22 Oct 2019 || 82 || align=left | Disc.: NEATAlt.: 2015 FZ330 || 
|- id="2002 MZ7" bgcolor=#d6d6d6
| 0 ||  || MBA-O || 16.16 || 3.3 km || multiple || 2000–2021 || 09 Jul 2021 || 192 || align=left | Disc.: NEATAlt.: 2012 PK8, 2015 FH385 || 
|- id="2002 MA8" bgcolor=#fefefe
| 0 ||  || MBA-I || 18.0 || data-sort-value="0.75" | 750 m || multiple || 2002–2019 || 26 Sep 2019 || 77 || align=left | Disc.: NEATAlt.: 2015 FH257 || 
|- id="2002 MC8" bgcolor=#fefefe
| 0 ||  || MBA-I || 18.04 || data-sort-value="0.73" | 730 m || multiple || 2002–2021 || 09 Nov 2021 || 51 || align=left | Disc.: NEAT || 
|- id="2002 ME8" bgcolor=#E9E9E9
| 0 ||  || MBA-M || 16.6 || 2.0 km || multiple || 2002–2020 || 14 Oct 2020 || 139 || align=left | Disc.: NEAT || 
|- id="2002 MF8" bgcolor=#fefefe
| 0 ||  || MBA-I || 17.70 || data-sort-value="0.86" | 860 m || multiple || 2002–2021 || 13 May 2021 || 118 || align=left | Disc.: LPL/Spacewatch II || 
|- id="2002 MJ8" bgcolor=#fefefe
| 0 ||  || MBA-I || 18.42 || data-sort-value="0.62" | 620 m || multiple || 2002–2021 || 15 Apr 2021 || 67 || align=left | Disc.: La Palma Obs. || 
|- id="2002 ML8" bgcolor=#fefefe
| 0 ||  || MBA-I || 18.4 || data-sort-value="0.62" | 620 m || multiple || 2002–2019 || 23 Sep 2019 || 50 || align=left | Disc.: La Palma Obs.Alt.: 2005 FW20 || 
|- id="2002 MM8" bgcolor=#d6d6d6
| 0 ||  || MBA-O || 16.4 || 2.9 km || multiple || 2002–2021 || 17 Jan 2021 || 71 || align=left | Disc.: La Palma Obs. || 
|}
back to top

N 

|- id="2002 NK" bgcolor=#FA8072
| – || 2002 NK || MCA || 17.2 || 1.1 km || single || 25 days || 26 Jul 2002 || 28 || align=left | Disc.: NEAT || 
|- id="2002 NW" bgcolor=#FFC2E0
| 6 || 2002 NW || APO || 24.2 || data-sort-value="0.051" | 51 m || single || 6 days || 11 Jul 2002 || 46 || align=left | Disc.: NEAT || 
|- id="2002 NW2" bgcolor=#d6d6d6
| 0 ||  || MBA-O || 16.79 || 2.4 km || multiple || 2002–2021 || 08 May 2021 || 98 || align=left | Disc.: NEAT || 
|- id="2002 NZ2" bgcolor=#E9E9E9
| 1 ||  || MBA-M || 17.3 || 1.0 km || multiple || 2002–2019 || 29 Oct 2019 || 110 || align=left | Disc.: NEAT || 
|- id="2002 NR7" bgcolor=#FA8072
| 0 ||  || MCA || 18.34 || data-sort-value="0.64" | 640 m || multiple || 2002–2020 || 14 Dec 2020 || 97 || align=left | Disc.: LINEAR || 
|- id="2002 NS7" bgcolor=#fefefe
| 1 ||  || MBA-I || 16.7 || 1.4 km || multiple || 2002–2021 || 06 Jan 2021 || 220 || align=left | Disc.: LINEAR || 
|- id="2002 NU7" bgcolor=#FA8072
| 0 ||  || MCA || 17.8 || data-sort-value="0.82" | 820 m || multiple || 2002–2020 || 25 Jan 2020 || 323 || align=left | Disc.: LINEAR || 
|- id="2002 NM16" bgcolor=#FA8072
| 0 ||  || MCA || 17.17 || 1.1 km || multiple || 2002–2022 || 27 Jan 2022 || 277 || align=left | Disc.: LINEAR || 
|- id="2002 NU16" bgcolor=#FA8072
| – ||  || MCA || 22.8 || data-sort-value="0.082" | 82 m || single || 1 day || 14 Jul 2002 || 20 || align=left | Disc.: La Palma Obs. || 
|- id="2002 NC21" bgcolor=#E9E9E9
| 0 ||  || MBA-M || 16.77 || 1.3 km || multiple || 2002–2021 || 02 Apr 2021 || 135 || align=left | Disc.: LINEARAlt.: 2014 MR68 || 
|- id="2002 NB22" bgcolor=#E9E9E9
| 0 ||  || MBA-M || 16.5 || 1.5 km || multiple || 2002–2021 || 18 Jan 2021 || 115 || align=left | Disc.: LINEAR || 
|- id="2002 NY29" bgcolor=#E9E9E9
| 3 ||  || MBA-M || 18.7 || data-sort-value="0.54" | 540 m || multiple || 2002–2014 || 21 May 2014 || 35 || align=left | Disc.: LPL/Spacewatch IIAlt.: 2014 JY7 || 
|- id="2002 NM30" bgcolor=#E9E9E9
| 0 ||  || MBA-M || 17.4 || 1.4 km || multiple || 2002–2021 || 08 Jan 2021 || 115 || align=left | Disc.: LPL/Spacewatch II || 
|- id="2002 NO30" bgcolor=#E9E9E9
| 0 ||  || MBA-M || 16.7 || 1.4 km || multiple || 2002–2020 || 24 Dec 2020 || 223 || align=left | Disc.: LONEOS || 
|- id="2002 NP37" bgcolor=#E9E9E9
| 0 ||  || MBA-M || 16.8 || 1.8 km || multiple || 2002–2021 || 12 Jan 2021 || 192 || align=left | Disc.: LINEAR || 
|- id="2002 NN39" bgcolor=#E9E9E9
| 1 ||  || MBA-M || 18.0 || data-sort-value="0.75" | 750 m || multiple || 2002–2019 || 20 Dec 2019 || 85 || align=left | Disc.: LINEARAlt.: 2019 LS10 || 
|- id="2002 NY40" bgcolor=#FFC2E0
| 0 ||  || APO || 19.0 || data-sort-value="0.56" | 560 m || multiple || 2002–2005 || 15 Jul 2005 || 2263 || align=left | Disc.: LINEARPotentially hazardous object || 
|- id="2002 NZ40" bgcolor=#fefefe
| 0 ||  || MBA-I || 18.6 || data-sort-value="0.57" | 570 m || multiple || 2002–2019 || 19 Nov 2019 || 48 || align=left | Disc.: NEAT || 
|- id="2002 NB41" bgcolor=#fefefe
| 0 ||  || HUN || 17.61 || data-sort-value="0.89" | 890 m || multiple || 2002–2021 || 29 Aug 2021 || 295 || align=left | Disc.: NEAT || 
|- id="2002 NA42" bgcolor=#fefefe
| 1 ||  || MBA-I || 18.4 || data-sort-value="0.62" | 620 m || multiple || 2002–2019 || 01 Nov 2019 || 109 || align=left | Disc.: NEAT || 
|- id="2002 NX46" bgcolor=#d6d6d6
| 0 ||  || MBA-O || 17.1 || 2.1 km || multiple || 2002–2021 || 11 Jan 2021 || 442 || align=left | Disc.: NEAT || 
|- id="2002 NG47" bgcolor=#E9E9E9
| 0 ||  || MBA-M || 17.9 || 1.1 km || multiple || 1998–2019 || 29 Jul 2019 || 106 || align=left | Disc.: NEATAlt.: 2015 MX44 || 
|- id="2002 NA48" bgcolor=#fefefe
| 0 ||  || MBA-I || 17.9 || data-sort-value="0.78" | 780 m || multiple || 2002–2019 || 10 Jan 2019 || 74 || align=left | Disc.: NEAT || 
|- id="2002 NG48" bgcolor=#E9E9E9
| 0 ||  || MBA-M || 16.3 || 1.6 km || multiple || 2002–2021 || 18 Jan 2021 || 367 || align=left | Disc.: NEAT || 
|- id="2002 NT48" bgcolor=#d6d6d6
| 0 ||  || MBA-O || 16.4 || 2.9 km || multiple || 2002–2021 || 18 Jan 2021 || 121 || align=left | Disc.: LINEARAlt.: 2012 HU67 || 
|- id="2002 NU52" bgcolor=#fefefe
| 1 ||  || MBA-I || 18.4 || data-sort-value="0.62" | 620 m || multiple || 2002–2019 || 27 Sep 2019 || 85 || align=left | Disc.: NEAT || 
|- id="2002 NF55" bgcolor=#d6d6d6
| 0 ||  || MBA-O || 15.9 || 3.7 km || multiple || 2002–2021 || 05 Jan 2021 || 130 || align=left | Disc.: NEAT || 
|- id="2002 NE56" bgcolor=#d6d6d6
| 0 ||  || MBA-O || 16.19 || 3.2 km || multiple || 2002–2022 || 08 Jan 2022 || 125 || align=left | Disc.: NEAT || 
|- id="2002 NS57" bgcolor=#E9E9E9
| 0 ||  || MBA-M || 18.2 || data-sort-value="0.68" | 680 m || multiple || 2002–2019 || 04 Nov 2019 || 35 || align=left | Disc.: NEATAdded on 17 June 2021Alt.: 2015 XQ214 || 
|- id="2002 NG58" bgcolor=#d6d6d6
| 0 ||  || MBA-O || 16.4 || 2.9 km || multiple || 2002–2021 || 15 Jan 2021 || 89 || align=left | Disc.: NEATAlt.: 2003 XW40 || 
|- id="2002 NW58" bgcolor=#d6d6d6
| 0 ||  || MBA-O || 16.7 || 2.5 km || multiple || 2002–2017 || 17 Oct 2017 || 64 || align=left | Disc.: NEAT || 
|- id="2002 NA60" bgcolor=#fefefe
| 1 ||  || MBA-I || 18.6 || data-sort-value="0.57" | 570 m || multiple || 2002–2019 || 28 Nov 2019 || 49 || align=left | Disc.: NEAT || 
|- id="2002 NJ60" bgcolor=#E9E9E9
| 0 ||  || MBA-M || 17.50 || data-sort-value="0.94" | 940 m || multiple || 1998–2021 || 07 Apr 2021 || 162 || align=left | Disc.: LONEOSAlt.: 1998 SA171 || 
|- id="2002 NT60" bgcolor=#E9E9E9
| 0 ||  || MBA-M || 16.7 || 1.4 km || multiple || 2002–2021 || 18 Jan 2021 || 333 || align=left | Disc.: NEAT || 
|- id="2002 NC61" bgcolor=#d6d6d6
| 2 ||  || MBA-O || 17.22 || 2.0 km || multiple || 2002–2023 || 19 Mar 2023 || 44 || align=left | Disc.: NEAT || 
|- id="2002 NH61" bgcolor=#fefefe
| 0 ||  || MBA-I || 18.4 || data-sort-value="0.62" | 620 m || multiple || 2002–2021 || 18 Jan 2021 || 75 || align=left | Disc.: NEAT || 
|- id="2002 NO62" bgcolor=#fefefe
| 2 ||  || MBA-I || 19.0 || data-sort-value="0.47" | 470 m || multiple || 2002–2019 || 23 Aug 2019 || 24 || align=left | Disc.: NEAT || 
|- id="2002 NV62" bgcolor=#E9E9E9
| 2 ||  || MBA-M || 18.0 || 1.1 km || multiple || 2002–2015 || 03 Oct 2015 || 79 || align=left | Disc.: NEAT || 
|- id="2002 NA63" bgcolor=#E9E9E9
| 0 ||  || MBA-M || 18.41 || 1.2 km || multiple || 2002–2020 || 13 Aug 2020 || 32 || align=left | Disc.: NEAT || 
|- id="2002 NE64" bgcolor=#E9E9E9
| 0 ||  || MBA-M || 17.3 || 1.5 km || multiple || 2002–2020 || 23 Oct 2020 || 83 || align=left | Disc.: NEATAlt.: 2010 MV115, 2015 MS112 || 
|- id="2002 NQ64" bgcolor=#E9E9E9
| 0 ||  || MBA-M || 17.3 || 1.5 km || multiple || 1994–2020 || 05 Nov 2020 || 118 || align=left | Disc.: NEATAlt.: 2015 PQ236 || 
|- id="2002 NT64" bgcolor=#fefefe
| 0 ||  || MBA-I || 18.4 || data-sort-value="0.62" | 620 m || multiple || 2002–2019 || 29 Nov 2019 || 77 || align=left | Disc.: NEAT || 
|- id="2002 NU64" bgcolor=#fefefe
| 0 ||  || MBA-I || 18.61 || data-sort-value="0.56" | 560 m || multiple || 2002–2021 || 10 Aug 2021 || 41 || align=left | Disc.: NEAT || 
|- id="2002 NA65" bgcolor=#fefefe
| 0 ||  || MBA-I || 18.36 || data-sort-value="0.63" | 630 m || multiple || 2002–2021 || 08 Aug 2021 || 37 || align=left | Disc.: NEAT || 
|- id="2002 ND65" bgcolor=#E9E9E9
| 0 ||  || MBA-M || 17.58 || data-sort-value="0.91" | 910 m || multiple || 2002–2021 || 15 Apr 2021 || 125 || align=left | Disc.: NEAT || 
|- id="2002 NE65" bgcolor=#d6d6d6
| 0 ||  || MBA-O || 16.74 || 2.5 km || multiple || 2000–2021 || 15 Apr 2021 || 107 || align=left | Disc.: NEAT || 
|- id="2002 NG65" bgcolor=#d6d6d6
| 0 ||  || MBA-O || 16.7 || 2.5 km || multiple || 2002–2021 || 18 Jan 2021 || 90 || align=left | Disc.: NEAT || 
|- id="2002 NO65" bgcolor=#E9E9E9
| 1 ||  || MBA-M || 17.05 || 1.2 km || multiple || 2002–2021 || 14 Apr 2021 || 66 || align=left | Disc.: NEAT || 
|- id="2002 NQ65" bgcolor=#E9E9E9
| 0 ||  || MBA-M || 17.9 || 1.1 km || multiple || 2002–2019 || 29 Sep 2019 || 51 || align=left | Disc.: NEAT || 
|- id="2002 NR65" bgcolor=#E9E9E9
| 0 ||  || MBA-M || 16.76 || 2.5 km || multiple || 2002–2021 || 28 Nov 2021 || 165 || align=left | Disc.: NEATAlt.: 2013 YM97 || 
|- id="2002 NC66" bgcolor=#d6d6d6
| 1 ||  || MBA-O || 16.5 || 2.8 km || multiple || 2002–2021 || 22 Jan 2021 || 86 || align=left | Disc.: NEAT || 
|- id="2002 NJ66" bgcolor=#E9E9E9
| 0 ||  || MBA-M || 16.8 || 1.8 km || multiple || 2002–2021 || 10 Jan 2021 || 94 || align=left | Disc.: NEAT || 
|- id="2002 NM66" bgcolor=#d6d6d6
| 0 ||  || MBA-O || 16.6 || 2.7 km || multiple || 2002–2021 || 18 Jan 2021 || 114 || align=left | Disc.: NEAT || 
|- id="2002 NP66" bgcolor=#E9E9E9
| 1 ||  || MBA-M || 17.4 || data-sort-value="0.98" | 980 m || multiple || 2002–2019 || 02 Nov 2019 || 42 || align=left | Disc.: NEAT || 
|- id="2002 NR66" bgcolor=#fefefe
| 3 ||  || MBA-I || 19.2 || data-sort-value="0.43" | 430 m || multiple || 2002–2019 || 29 Sep 2019 || 23 || align=left | Disc.: NEAT || 
|- id="2002 NX66" bgcolor=#FA8072
| 1 ||  || MCA || 19.8 || data-sort-value="0.33" | 330 m || multiple || 2002–2018 || 11 Jul 2018 || 30 || align=left | Disc.: NEAT || 
|- id="2002 NZ66" bgcolor=#E9E9E9
| 0 ||  || MBA-M || 17.66 || 1.2 km || multiple || 2002–2022 || 27 Jan 2022 || 115 || align=left | Disc.: NEATAlt.: 2010 GZ160, 2014 DV124 || 
|- id="2002 NC67" bgcolor=#E9E9E9
| 0 ||  || MBA-M || 17.8 || data-sort-value="0.82" | 820 m || multiple || 2002–2019 || 20 Dec 2019 || 57 || align=left | Disc.: NEAT || 
|- id="2002 ND67" bgcolor=#d6d6d6
| 0 ||  || MBA-O || 17.2 || 2.0 km || multiple || 2002–2018 || 06 Oct 2018 || 59 || align=left | Disc.: NEAT || 
|- id="2002 NE67" bgcolor=#E9E9E9
| 0 ||  || MBA-M || 17.3 || 1.0 km || multiple || 2002–2021 || 18 Jan 2021 || 191 || align=left | Disc.: NEATAlt.: 2011 UB85 || 
|- id="2002 NF67" bgcolor=#fefefe
| 0 ||  || MBA-I || 18.50 || data-sort-value="0.59" | 590 m || multiple || 2002–2021 || 09 Nov 2021 || 75 || align=left | Disc.: LPL/Spacewatch II || 
|- id="2002 NM67" bgcolor=#d6d6d6
| 0 ||  || MBA-O || 16.7 || 2.5 km || multiple || 2002–2019 || 21 Nov 2019 || 96 || align=left | Disc.: NEAT || 
|- id="2002 NZ67" bgcolor=#E9E9E9
| 0 ||  || MBA-M || 17.25 || 1.1 km || multiple || 2002–2021 || 14 Apr 2021 || 54 || align=left | Disc.: NEATAlt.: 2019 XF10 || 
|- id="2002 NB68" bgcolor=#fefefe
| 2 ||  || MBA-I || 18.9 || data-sort-value="0.49" | 490 m || multiple || 2002–2020 || 11 Nov 2020 || 38 || align=left | Disc.: NEAT || 
|- id="2002 NY68" bgcolor=#E9E9E9
| 1 ||  || MBA-M || 17.7 || data-sort-value="0.86" | 860 m || multiple || 2002–2019 || 31 Oct 2019 || 64 || align=left | Disc.: NEAT || 
|- id="2002 NF69" bgcolor=#fefefe
| 0 ||  || MBA-I || 17.99 || data-sort-value="0.75" | 750 m || multiple || 2002–2021 || 09 Apr 2021 || 167 || align=left | Disc.: NEAT || 
|- id="2002 NL69" bgcolor=#d6d6d6
| 0 ||  || MBA-O || 16.4 || 2.9 km || multiple || 2002–2019 || 18 Nov 2019 || 101 || align=left | Disc.: NEATAlt.: 2013 QB45 || 
|- id="2002 NE70" bgcolor=#d6d6d6
| 0 ||  || MBA-O || 16.67 || 2.6 km || multiple || 2002–2022 || 07 Jan 2022 || 54 || align=left | Disc.: NEAT || 
|- id="2002 NF70" bgcolor=#d6d6d6
| 0 ||  || MBA-O || 16.3 || 3.1 km || multiple || 2002–2020 || 10 Nov 2020 || 87 || align=left | Disc.: NEAT || 
|- id="2002 NK70" bgcolor=#E9E9E9
| 0 ||  || MBA-M || 17.58 || data-sort-value="0.91" | 910 m || multiple || 2002–2021 || 14 Apr 2021 || 79 || align=left | Disc.: NEAT || 
|- id="2002 NO70" bgcolor=#E9E9E9
| 0 ||  || MBA-M || 17.8 || data-sort-value="0.82" | 820 m || multiple || 2002–2020 || 21 Jan 2020 || 77 || align=left | Disc.: NEATAlt.: 2015 YT3 || 
|- id="2002 NR70" bgcolor=#E9E9E9
| 0 ||  || MBA-M || 17.41 || data-sort-value="0.98" | 980 m || multiple || 1996–2021 || 15 Apr 2021 || 161 || align=left | Disc.: NEAT || 
|- id="2002 NU70" bgcolor=#d6d6d6
| 0 ||  || MBA-O || 16.3 || 3.1 km || multiple || 2002–2020 || 16 Feb 2020 || 125 || align=left | Disc.: NEAT || 
|- id="2002 NW70" bgcolor=#fefefe
| 0 ||  || MBA-I || 18.23 || data-sort-value="0.67" | 670 m || multiple || 2002–2021 || 25 Sep 2021 || 102 || align=left | Disc.: NEATAlt.: 2006 SQ21 || 
|- id="2002 ND71" bgcolor=#d6d6d6
| 0 ||  || MBA-O || 16.1 || 3.4 km || multiple || 2002–2018 || 10 Nov 2018 || 98 || align=left | Disc.: NEAT || 
|- id="2002 NE71" bgcolor=#FFC2E0
| 1 ||  || APO || 19.2 || data-sort-value="0.51" | 510 m || multiple || 2002–2018 || 24 Jul 2018 || 222 || align=left | Disc.: NEAT || 
|- id="2002 NG71" bgcolor=#d6d6d6
| 0 ||  || MBA-O || 16.3 || 3.1 km || multiple || 2002–2020 || 24 Dec 2020 || 133 || align=left | Disc.: NEAT || 
|- id="2002 NJ71" bgcolor=#fefefe
| 0 ||  || MBA-I || 18.7 || data-sort-value="0.54" | 540 m || multiple || 2002–2020 || 10 Oct 2020 || 124 || align=left | Disc.: NEATAlt.: 2013 TV19 || 
|- id="2002 NL71" bgcolor=#E9E9E9
| 0 ||  || MBA-M || 17.3 || 1.0 km || multiple || 2002–2019 || 29 Nov 2019 || 133 || align=left | Disc.: NEAT || 
|- id="2002 NX71" bgcolor=#fefefe
| 0 ||  || MBA-I || 18.84 || data-sort-value="0.51" | 510 m || multiple || 2002–2021 || 13 Oct 2021 || 55 || align=left | Disc.: NEAT || 
|- id="2002 NY71" bgcolor=#E9E9E9
| 0 ||  || MBA-M || 17.9 || data-sort-value="0.78" | 780 m || multiple || 2002–2019 || 02 Nov 2019 || 63 || align=left | Disc.: NEAT || 
|- id="2002 NZ71" bgcolor=#E9E9E9
| 1 ||  || MBA-M || 17.0 || 2.1 km || multiple || 2002–2020 || 23 Dec 2020 || 48 || align=left | Disc.: NEATAlt.: 2010 GM169 || 
|- id="2002 NA72" bgcolor=#E9E9E9
| 0 ||  || MBA-M || 17.8 || 1.2 km || multiple || 1998–2020 || 05 Nov 2020 || 83 || align=left | Disc.: NEAT || 
|- id="2002 NB72" bgcolor=#fefefe
| 1 ||  || MBA-I || 19.20 || data-sort-value="0.43" | 430 m || multiple || 2002–2021 || 28 Oct 2021 || 41 || align=left | Disc.: NEAT || 
|- id="2002 NC72" bgcolor=#d6d6d6
| 0 ||  || MBA-O || 16.07 || 3.4 km || multiple || 2002–2021 || 05 May 2021 || 224 || align=left | Disc.: NEAT || 
|- id="2002 ND72" bgcolor=#FA8072
| 4 ||  || MCA || 19.6 || data-sort-value="0.36" | 360 m || multiple || 2002–2015 || 23 Jun 2015 || 17 || align=left | Disc.: NEATAdded on 21 August 2021 || 
|- id="2002 NL72" bgcolor=#d6d6d6
| 0 ||  || MBA-O || 16.7 || 2.5 km || multiple || 2002–2021 || 15 Jan 2021 || 78 || align=left | Disc.: NEAT || 
|- id="2002 NM72" bgcolor=#E9E9E9
| 1 ||  || MBA-M || 17.86 || data-sort-value="0.80" | 800 m || multiple || 2002–2021 || 14 Apr 2021 || 44 || align=left | Disc.: NEAT || 
|- id="2002 NR72" bgcolor=#E9E9E9
| 3 ||  || MBA-M || 17.8 || 1.2 km || multiple || 2002–2019 || 23 Apr 2019 || 29 || align=left | Disc.: NEAT || 
|- id="2002 NA73" bgcolor=#E9E9E9
| 0 ||  || MBA-M || 17.3 || 1.0 km || multiple || 2002–2019 || 20 Dec 2019 || 93 || align=left | Disc.: NEAT || 
|- id="2002 NC73" bgcolor=#d6d6d6
| 0 ||  || MBA-O || 16.0 || 3.5 km || multiple || 2002–2021 || 07 Jun 2021 || 304 || align=left | Disc.: NEAT || 
|- id="2002 ND73" bgcolor=#d6d6d6
| 2 ||  || MBA-O || 16.9 || 2.3 km || multiple || 2002–2019 || 22 Oct 2019 || 49 || align=left | Disc.: NEAT || 
|- id="2002 NF73" bgcolor=#d6d6d6
| 0 ||  || MBA-O || 16.76 || 2.5 km || multiple || 2002–2022 || 25 Jan 2022 || 73 || align=left | Disc.: NEAT || 
|- id="2002 NG73" bgcolor=#fefefe
| 1 ||  || MBA-I || 18.7 || data-sort-value="0.54" | 540 m || multiple || 2002–2020 || 26 Jan 2020 || 73 || align=left | Disc.: NEATAlt.: 2015 TH297 || 
|- id="2002 NL73" bgcolor=#FA8072
| 3 ||  || MCA || 17.8 || data-sort-value="0.82" | 820 m || multiple || 2002–2020 || 25 Jan 2020 || 34 || align=left | Disc.: NEAT || 
|- id="2002 NM73" bgcolor=#FA8072
| 0 ||  || MCA || 19.0 || data-sort-value="0.47" | 470 m || multiple || 2002–2018 || 03 Jun 2018 || 72 || align=left | Disc.: NEAT || 
|- id="2002 NQ73" bgcolor=#d6d6d6
| 0 ||  || MBA-O || 15.9 || 3.7 km || multiple || 2002–2021 || 10 Jan 2021 || 146 || align=left | Disc.: NEATAlt.: 2013 QQ71 || 
|- id="2002 NY73" bgcolor=#E9E9E9
| 0 ||  || MBA-M || 17.9 || 1.5 km || multiple || 2002–2020 || 16 Nov 2020 || 99 || align=left | Disc.: NEAT || 
|- id="2002 NA74" bgcolor=#d6d6d6
| 0 ||  || MBA-O || 16.2 || 3.2 km || multiple || 2002–2021 || 07 Jan 2021 || 142 || align=left | Disc.: NEATAlt.: 2013 QY53 || 
|- id="2002 NG74" bgcolor=#fefefe
| 1 ||  || MBA-I || 19.0 || data-sort-value="0.47" | 470 m || multiple || 2002–2020 || 09 Dec 2020 || 30 || align=left | Disc.: NEAT || 
|- id="2002 NN74" bgcolor=#E9E9E9
| 1 ||  || MBA-M || 17.7 || data-sort-value="0.86" | 860 m || multiple || 2002–2019 || 28 Nov 2019 || 61 || align=left | Disc.: NEAT || 
|- id="2002 NQ74" bgcolor=#E9E9E9
| 0 ||  || MBA-M || 17.69 || 1.6 km || multiple || 2002–2021 || 29 Nov 2021 || 105 || align=left | Disc.: NEATAlt.: 2016 PV37 || 
|- id="2002 NA75" bgcolor=#fefefe
| 1 ||  || MBA-I || 18.5 || data-sort-value="0.59" | 590 m || multiple || 2002–2019 || 23 May 2019 || 57 || align=left | Disc.: NEAT || 
|- id="2002 NC75" bgcolor=#fefefe
| 0 ||  || HUN || 18.49 || data-sort-value="0.60" | 600 m || multiple || 2002–2021 || 30 May 2021 || 74 || align=left | Disc.: NEATAlt.: 2015 BV160 || 
|- id="2002 NH75" bgcolor=#fefefe
| 1 ||  || MBA-I || 18.24 || data-sort-value="0.67" | 670 m || multiple || 2002–2018 || 15 Dec 2018 || 33 || align=left | Disc.: NEAT || 
|- id="2002 NL75" bgcolor=#fefefe
| 0 ||  || MBA-I || 18.0 || data-sort-value="0.75" | 750 m || multiple || 2002–2020 || 16 Dec 2020 || 114 || align=left | Disc.: NEAT || 
|- id="2002 NN75" bgcolor=#E9E9E9
| 0 ||  || MBA-M || 17.4 || data-sort-value="0.98" | 980 m || multiple || 2002–2021 || 18 Jan 2021 || 147 || align=left | Disc.: NEAT || 
|- id="2002 NO75" bgcolor=#E9E9E9
| – ||  || MBA-M || 18.7 || data-sort-value="0.54" | 540 m || single || 44 days || 27 Aug 2002 || 18 || align=left | Disc.: NEAT || 
|- id="2002 NP75" bgcolor=#E9E9E9
| 1 ||  || MBA-M || 17.2 || 1.1 km || multiple || 2002–2019 || 20 Dec 2019 || 81 || align=left | Disc.: NEATAlt.: 2014 LA13 || 
|- id="2002 NR75" bgcolor=#fefefe
| 0 ||  || MBA-I || 19.2 || data-sort-value="0.43" | 430 m || multiple || 2002–2019 || 25 Sep 2019 || 47 || align=left | Disc.: NEAT || 
|- id="2002 NW75" bgcolor=#E9E9E9
| 0 ||  || MBA-M || 18.0 || 1.1 km || multiple || 2002–2019 || 23 Aug 2019 || 74 || align=left | Disc.: NEATAlt.: 2015 TW195 || 
|- id="2002 NX75" bgcolor=#E9E9E9
| 0 ||  || MBA-M || 17.2 || 1.5 km || multiple || 2002–2020 || 13 Oct 2020 || 51 || align=left | Disc.: NEAT || 
|- id="2002 NY75" bgcolor=#d6d6d6
| 0 ||  || MBA-O || 16.8 || 2.4 km || multiple || 2002–2019 || 03 Dec 2019 || 63 || align=left | Disc.: NEATAlt.: 2008 UC236 || 
|- id="2002 NZ75" bgcolor=#fefefe
| 0 ||  || MBA-I || 18.8 || data-sort-value="0.52" | 520 m || multiple || 2002–2020 || 23 May 2020 || 86 || align=left | Disc.: NEATAlt.: 2006 UU83 || 
|- id="2002 NB76" bgcolor=#d6d6d6
| 0 ||  || MBA-O || 16.44 || 2.9 km || multiple || 2001–2022 || 25 Jan 2022 || 153 || align=left | Disc.: NEAT || 
|- id="2002 ND76" bgcolor=#E9E9E9
| 1 ||  || MBA-M || 18.0 || 1.1 km || multiple || 2002–2015 || 09 Dec 2015 || 87 || align=left | Disc.: NEATAlt.: 2011 UT186 || 
|- id="2002 NG76" bgcolor=#fefefe
| 0 ||  || MBA-I || 18.46 || data-sort-value="0.60" | 600 m || multiple || 2002–2021 || 11 Jun 2021 || 91 || align=left | Disc.: NEAT || 
|- id="2002 NM76" bgcolor=#d6d6d6
| 0 ||  || MBA-O || 17.3 || 1.9 km || multiple || 2002–2019 || 19 Nov 2019 || 70 || align=left | Disc.: NEATAlt.: 2013 ND8 || 
|- id="2002 NN76" bgcolor=#d6d6d6
| 0 ||  || MBA-O || 15.94 || 3.6 km || multiple || 2002–2021 || 12 May 2021 || 223 || align=left | Disc.: NEATAlt.: 2003 WU49 || 
|- id="2002 NO76" bgcolor=#E9E9E9
| 0 ||  || MBA-M || 17.34 || 2.1 km || multiple || 2002–2021 || 14 Apr 2021 || 76 || align=left | Disc.: NEATAlt.: 2010 GT82 || 
|- id="2002 NP76" bgcolor=#E9E9E9
| 1 ||  || MBA-M || 17.2 || 1.1 km || multiple || 2002–2019 || 30 Nov 2019 || 84 || align=left | Disc.: NEATAlt.: 2013 EC98 || 
|- id="2002 NR76" bgcolor=#E9E9E9
| 0 ||  || MBA-M || 17.53 || 1.7 km || multiple || 2002–2021 || 30 Nov 2021 || 144 || align=left | Disc.: NEATAlt.: 2007 UY107 || 
|- id="2002 NS76" bgcolor=#E9E9E9
| 1 ||  || MBA-M || 18.0 || data-sort-value="0.75" | 750 m || multiple || 2002–2019 || 26 Nov 2019 || 46 || align=left | Disc.: NEAT || 
|- id="2002 NT76" bgcolor=#E9E9E9
| 0 ||  || MBA-M || 17.67 || data-sort-value="0.87" | 870 m || multiple || 2002–2021 || 10 May 2021 || 88 || align=left | Disc.: NEAT || 
|- id="2002 NV76" bgcolor=#d6d6d6
| 2 ||  || MBA-O || 17.2 || 2.0 km || multiple || 2002–2018 || 11 Aug 2018 || 34 || align=left | Disc.: NEAT || 
|- id="2002 NX76" bgcolor=#E9E9E9
| 0 ||  || MBA-M || 17.0 || 1.7 km || multiple || 2002–2021 || 18 Jan 2021 || 114 || align=left | Disc.: NEAT || 
|- id="2002 NC77" bgcolor=#fefefe
| 0 ||  || MBA-I || 17.5 || data-sort-value="0.94" | 940 m || multiple || 2002–2020 || 22 Nov 2020 || 150 || align=left | Disc.: NEAT || 
|- id="2002 ND77" bgcolor=#fefefe
| 0 ||  || MBA-I || 17.7 || data-sort-value="0.86" | 860 m || multiple || 2002–2020 || 17 Dec 2020 || 96 || align=left | Disc.: NEAT || 
|- id="2002 NF77" bgcolor=#E9E9E9
| 0 ||  || MBA-M || 16.5 || 1.5 km || multiple || 2002–2021 || 22 Jan 2021 || 152 || align=left | Disc.: NEAT || 
|- id="2002 NH77" bgcolor=#fefefe
| 0 ||  || MBA-I || 17.7 || data-sort-value="0.86" | 860 m || multiple || 2002–2020 || 21 Jul 2020 || 105 || align=left | Disc.: NEAT || 
|- id="2002 NJ77" bgcolor=#E9E9E9
| 0 ||  || MBA-M || 17.1 || 1.1 km || multiple || 2002–2021 || 18 Jan 2021 || 79 || align=left | Disc.: NEAT || 
|- id="2002 NK77" bgcolor=#d6d6d6
| 0 ||  || MBA-O || 16.3 || 3.1 km || multiple || 2002–2019 || 04 Nov 2019 || 80 || align=left | Disc.: NEAT || 
|- id="2002 NL77" bgcolor=#E9E9E9
| 1 ||  || MBA-M || 18.0 || data-sort-value="0.75" | 750 m || multiple || 2002–2019 || 31 Aug 2019 || 21 || align=left | Disc.: NEAT || 
|- id="2002 NO77" bgcolor=#fefefe
| 0 ||  || MBA-I || 18.7 || data-sort-value="0.54" | 540 m || multiple || 2002–2019 || 27 Sep 2019 || 158 || align=left | Disc.: NEATAlt.: 2009 QV61 || 
|- id="2002 NQ77" bgcolor=#fefefe
| 0 ||  || MBA-I || 18.5 || data-sort-value="0.59" | 590 m || multiple || 2002–2019 || 26 Sep 2019 || 72 || align=left | Disc.: NEAT || 
|- id="2002 NX77" bgcolor=#d6d6d6
| 0 ||  || HIL || 15.9 || 3.7 km || multiple || 2002–2019 || 20 Dec 2019 || 76 || align=left | Disc.: NEATAlt.: 2011 UC299 || 
|- id="2002 NZ77" bgcolor=#E9E9E9
| 0 ||  || MBA-M || 18.51 || data-sort-value="0.83" | 830 m || multiple || 2002–2019 || 02 Oct 2019 || 44 || align=left | Disc.: NEAT || 
|- id="2002 NO78" bgcolor=#fefefe
| 0 ||  || MBA-I || 17.8 || data-sort-value="0.82" | 820 m || multiple || 1999–2020 || 20 Oct 2020 || 165 || align=left | Disc.: NEATAlt.: 2005 GS33 || 
|- id="2002 NQ78" bgcolor=#d6d6d6
| 0 ||  || MBA-O || 16.26 || 3.1 km || multiple || 2002–2022 || 05 Jan 2022 || 138 || align=left | Disc.: NEATAlt.: 2010 CV226 || 
|- id="2002 NR78" bgcolor=#E9E9E9
| 0 ||  || MBA-M || 17.6 || 1.3 km || multiple || 2002–2019 || 29 Sep 2019 || 59 || align=left | Disc.: NEATAlt.: 2011 SY163 || 
|- id="2002 NU78" bgcolor=#fefefe
| 0 ||  || MBA-I || 17.8 || data-sort-value="0.82" | 820 m || multiple || 1999–2021 || 17 Jan 2021 || 119 || align=left | Disc.: NEAT || 
|- id="2002 NV78" bgcolor=#fefefe
| 0 ||  || MBA-I || 18.3 || data-sort-value="0.65" | 650 m || multiple || 2002–2020 || 20 Dec 2020 || 183 || align=left | Disc.: NEATAlt.: 2006 WX113 || 
|- id="2002 NX78" bgcolor=#fefefe
| 0 ||  || MBA-I || 18.3 || data-sort-value="0.65" | 650 m || multiple || 2002–2019 || 01 Aug 2019 || 58 || align=left | Disc.: NEAT || 
|- id="2002 NY78" bgcolor=#d6d6d6
| 0 ||  || MBA-O || 16.2 || 3.2 km || multiple || 2002–2021 || 17 Jan 2021 || 138 || align=left | Disc.: NEATAlt.: 2012 LB23 || 
|- id="2002 NC79" bgcolor=#fefefe
| 0 ||  || MBA-I || 18.4 || data-sort-value="0.62" | 620 m || multiple || 2002–2020 || 17 Dec 2020 || 49 || align=left | Disc.: NEAT || 
|- id="2002 NE79" bgcolor=#E9E9E9
| 0 ||  || MBA-M || 17.4 || 1.4 km || multiple || 2002–2021 || 06 Jan 2021 || 64 || align=left | Disc.: NEATAlt.: 2015 TN163 || 
|- id="2002 NG79" bgcolor=#E9E9E9
| 0 ||  || MBA-M || 17.2 || 1.5 km || multiple || 2002–2020 || 17 Sep 2020 || 67 || align=left | Disc.: NEAT || 
|- id="2002 NJ79" bgcolor=#fefefe
| 1 ||  || MBA-I || 18.0 || data-sort-value="0.75" | 750 m || multiple || 2002–2021 || 03 Aug 2021 || 61 || align=left | Disc.: NEATAdded on 22 July 2020Alt.: 2009 FU27 || 
|- id="2002 NK79" bgcolor=#d6d6d6
| 2 ||  || MBA-O || 16.8 || 2.4 km || multiple || 2002–2018 || 05 Aug 2018 || 30 || align=left | Disc.: NEAT || 
|- id="2002 NM79" bgcolor=#E9E9E9
| 0 ||  || MBA-M || 17.0 || 1.2 km || multiple || 2002–2021 || 18 Jan 2021 || 210 || align=left | Disc.: NEATAlt.: 2011 UB386 || 
|- id="2002 NO79" bgcolor=#E9E9E9
| 0 ||  || MBA-M || 15.81 || 2.9 km || multiple || 2002–2022 || 25 Jan 2022 || 308 || align=left | Disc.: NEATAlt.: 2010 BW77 || 
|- id="2002 NR79" bgcolor=#E9E9E9
| 0 ||  || MBA-M || 17.48 || data-sort-value="0.95" | 950 m || multiple || 2002–2021 || 15 Apr 2021 || 64 || align=left | Disc.: NEATAlt.: 2012 AO1 || 
|- id="2002 NZ79" bgcolor=#E9E9E9
| 0 ||  || MBA-M || 17.3 || 1.0 km || multiple || 2002–2020 || 21 Jan 2020 || 133 || align=left | Disc.: NEAT || 
|- id="2002 NB80" bgcolor=#E9E9E9
| 1 ||  || MBA-M || 17.3 || 1.0 km || multiple || 2002–2019 || 31 Dec 2019 || 73 || align=left | Disc.: NEATAlt.: 2013 EG65 || 
|- id="2002 NE80" bgcolor=#E9E9E9
| 0 ||  || MBA-M || 16.6 || 2.0 km || multiple || 2002–2021 || 09 Jan 2021 || 166 || align=left | Disc.: NEAT || 
|- id="2002 NF80" bgcolor=#E9E9E9
| 0 ||  || MBA-M || 17.2 || 1.5 km || multiple || 2002–2020 || 20 Dec 2020 || 150 || align=left | Disc.: NEAT || 
|- id="2002 NH80" bgcolor=#FA8072
| 0 ||  || MCA || 18.4 || data-sort-value="0.62" | 620 m || multiple || 2002–2021 || 15 Jun 2021 || 72 || align=left | Disc.: NEAT || 
|- id="2002 NJ80" bgcolor=#E9E9E9
| 0 ||  || MBA-M || 16.6 || 3.0 km || multiple || 2002–2021 || 18 Jan 2021 || 224 || align=left | Disc.: NEATAlt.: 2010 ET57 || 
|- id="2002 NK80" bgcolor=#d6d6d6
| 0 ||  || MBA-O || 16.0 || 3.5 km || multiple || 2000–2020 || 23 Oct 2020 || 98 || align=left | Disc.: NEAT || 
|- id="2002 NL80" bgcolor=#fefefe
| 0 ||  || MBA-I || 18.46 || data-sort-value="0.60" | 600 m || multiple || 2002–2021 || 08 May 2021 || 78 || align=left | Disc.: NEATAlt.: 2012 TQ70 || 
|- id="2002 NN80" bgcolor=#d6d6d6
| 0 ||  || MBA-O || 16.1 || 3.4 km || multiple || 2002–2021 || 04 Jan 2021 || 89 || align=left | Disc.: NEAT || 
|- id="2002 NP80" bgcolor=#d6d6d6
| 0 ||  || MBA-O || 16.47 || 2.8 km || multiple || 1995–2021 || 10 May 2021 || 207 || align=left | Disc.: NEATAlt.: 2007 LJ25 || 
|- id="2002 NR80" bgcolor=#d6d6d6
| 0 ||  || MBA-O || 17.38 || 1.9 km || multiple || 2002–2021 || 16 Apr 2021 || 58 || align=left | Disc.: NEAT || 
|- id="2002 NS80" bgcolor=#d6d6d6
| 0 ||  || MBA-O || 16.6 || 2.7 km || multiple || 2002–2020 || 23 Jan 2020 || 132 || align=left | Disc.: NEAT || 
|- id="2002 NT80" bgcolor=#fefefe
| 0 ||  || MBA-I || 17.50 || data-sort-value="0.94" | 940 m || multiple || 2002–2021 || 06 Mar 2021 || 256 || align=left | Disc.: NEATAlt.: 2009 SX200 || 
|- id="2002 NU80" bgcolor=#E9E9E9
| 2 ||  || MBA-M || 17.7 || data-sort-value="0.86" | 860 m || multiple || 2002–2017 || 28 Mar 2017 || 19 || align=left | Disc.: NEAT || 
|- id="2002 NW80" bgcolor=#E9E9E9
| 1 ||  || MBA-M || 17.3 || 1.0 km || multiple || 2002–2017 || 28 Jan 2017 || 34 || align=left | Disc.: NEAT || 
|- id="2002 NY80" bgcolor=#E9E9E9
| 0 ||  || MBA-M || 16.4 || 1.6 km || multiple || 2002–2021 || 18 Jan 2021 || 167 || align=left | Disc.: NEAT || 
|- id="2002 NZ80" bgcolor=#E9E9E9
| 0 ||  || MBA-M || 17.33 || 1.0 km || multiple || 2000–2021 || 08 May 2021 || 113 || align=left | Disc.: NEATAlt.: 2012 CR27, 2014 NB62, 2016 CS167 || 
|- id="2002 NB81" bgcolor=#E9E9E9
| 0 ||  || MBA-M || 17.4 || 1.4 km || multiple || 2002–2019 || 29 Sep 2019 || 113 || align=left | Disc.: NEATAlt.: 2011 UM371 || 
|- id="2002 NC81" bgcolor=#fefefe
| 0 ||  || MBA-I || 18.47 || data-sort-value="0.60" | 600 m || multiple || 2002–2021 || 09 May 2021 || 77 || align=left | Disc.: NEAT || 
|- id="2002 NE81" bgcolor=#fefefe
| 0 ||  || MBA-I || 17.2 || 1.1 km || multiple || 1995–2021 || 12 Jun 2021 || 169 || align=left | Disc.: NEAT || 
|- id="2002 NF81" bgcolor=#fefefe
| 0 ||  || MBA-I || 17.9 || data-sort-value="0.78" | 780 m || multiple || 2002–2021 || 18 Jan 2021 || 203 || align=left | Disc.: NEATAlt.: 2008 GK39, 2009 SH324 || 
|- id="2002 NK81" bgcolor=#fefefe
| 0 ||  || MBA-I || 17.75 || data-sort-value="0.84" | 840 m || multiple || 2002–2022 || 07 Jan 2022 || 90 || align=left | Disc.: NEATAlt.: 2015 AT224 || 
|- id="2002 NL81" bgcolor=#E9E9E9
| 0 ||  || MBA-M || 17.2 || 1.1 km || multiple || 2002–2020 || 04 Jan 2020 || 52 || align=left | Disc.: NEAT || 
|- id="2002 NM81" bgcolor=#d6d6d6
| 0 ||  || MBA-O || 16.2 || 3.6 km || multiple || 2002–2021 || 12 Jan 2021 || 89 || align=left | Disc.: NEATAlt.: 2010 EP1 || 
|- id="2002 NN81" bgcolor=#E9E9E9
| 1 ||  || MBA-M || 18.1 || 1.0 km || multiple || 2002–2020 || 08 Nov 2020 || 87 || align=left | Disc.: NEAT || 
|- id="2002 NO81" bgcolor=#fefefe
| 3 ||  || MBA-I || 18.7 || data-sort-value="0.54" | 540 m || multiple || 2002–2016 || 19 Nov 2016 || 33 || align=left | Disc.: NEAT || 
|- id="2002 NP81" bgcolor=#fefefe
| 0 ||  || MBA-I || 18.39 || data-sort-value="0.62" | 620 m || multiple || 2002–2021 || 03 May 2021 || 68 || align=left | Disc.: NEATAlt.: 2008 HS44 || 
|- id="2002 NQ81" bgcolor=#E9E9E9
| 0 ||  || MBA-M || 17.15 || 1.1 km || multiple || 2002–2021 || 07 Apr 2021 || 104 || align=left | Disc.: NEATAlt.: 2011 YZ8 || 
|- id="2002 NS81" bgcolor=#E9E9E9
| 0 ||  || MBA-M || 17.65 || data-sort-value="0.88" | 880 m || multiple || 2002–2022 || 25 Jan 2022 || 82 || align=left | Disc.: NEATAlt.: 2005 BA34 || 
|- id="2002 NT81" bgcolor=#d6d6d6
| 0 ||  || MBA-O || 16.6 || 2.7 km || multiple || 2002–2019 || 01 Nov 2019 || 147 || align=left | Disc.: NEATAlt.: 2014 XJ21 || 
|- id="2002 NX81" bgcolor=#d6d6d6
| – ||  || MBA-O || 17.5 || 1.8 km || single || 53 days || 26 Aug 2002 || 18 || align=left | Disc.: NEAT || 
|- id="2002 NY81" bgcolor=#d6d6d6
| 0 ||  || MBA-O || 16.1 || 3.4 km || multiple || 2002–2021 || 17 Jan 2021 || 202 || align=left | Disc.: NEATAlt.: 2016 CH99 || 
|- id="2002 NZ81" bgcolor=#E9E9E9
| 0 ||  || MBA-M || 17.39 || data-sort-value="0.99" | 990 m || multiple || 2002–2021 || 15 Apr 2021 || 156 || align=left | Disc.: NEAT || 
|- id="2002 NB82" bgcolor=#E9E9E9
| 0 ||  || MBA-M || 17.7 || data-sort-value="0.86" | 860 m || multiple || 2002–2021 || 17 Feb 2021 || 42 || align=left | Disc.: NEAT || 
|- id="2002 NC82" bgcolor=#fefefe
| 0 ||  || MBA-I || 18.6 || data-sort-value="0.57" | 570 m || multiple || 2002–2020 || 25 Oct 2020 || 66 || align=left | Disc.: NEATAlt.: 2016 LZ43 || 
|- id="2002 ND82" bgcolor=#E9E9E9
| 0 ||  || MBA-M || 16.6 || 1.4 km || multiple || 2002–2021 || 12 Jan 2021 || 200 || align=left | Disc.: NEATAlt.: 2015 TE230 || 
|- id="2002 NE82" bgcolor=#E9E9E9
| 0 ||  || MBA-M || 16.97 || 1.2 km || multiple || 2002–2021 || 14 Apr 2021 || 246 || align=left | Disc.: NEAT || 
|- id="2002 NG82" bgcolor=#E9E9E9
| 3 ||  || MBA-M || 18.1 || data-sort-value="0.98" | 750 m || multiple || 2002-2019 || 17 Dec 2019 || 29 || align=left | Disc.: NEAT || 
|- id="2002 NH82" bgcolor=#d6d6d6
| 0 ||  || MBA-O || 17.5 || 1.8 km || multiple || 2002–2018 || 15 Oct 2018 || 65 || align=left | Disc.: NEAT || 
|- id="2002 NJ82" bgcolor=#d6d6d6
| 0 ||  || MBA-O || 16.7 || 2.5 km || multiple || 2002–2018 || 12 Jul 2018 || 45 || align=left | Disc.: NEAT || 
|- id="2002 NK82" bgcolor=#d6d6d6
| 1 ||  || MBA-O || 17.5 || 1.8 km || multiple || 2002–2018 || 11 Aug 2018 || 44 || align=left | Disc.: NEAT || 
|- id="2002 NL82" bgcolor=#E9E9E9
| – ||  || MBA-M || 18.3 || data-sort-value="0.65" | 650 m || single || 21 days || 27 Jul 2002 || 12 || align=left | Disc.: NEAT || 
|- id="2002 NN82" bgcolor=#d6d6d6
| 0 ||  || MBA-O || 16.3 || 3.1 km || multiple || 2002–2020 || 15 Nov 2020 || 114 || align=left | Disc.: NEAT || 
|- id="2002 NO82" bgcolor=#E9E9E9
| 0 ||  || MBA-M || 17.27 || 1.0 km || multiple || 2002–2021 || 03 Apr 2021 || 267 || align=left | Disc.: NEAT || 
|- id="2002 NQ82" bgcolor=#fefefe
| 0 ||  || MBA-I || 17.5 || data-sort-value="0.94" | 940 m || multiple || 2002–2021 || 03 Jun 2021 || 47 || align=left | Disc.: NEAT || 
|- id="2002 NS82" bgcolor=#d6d6d6
| 0 ||  || MBA-O || 16.2 || 3.2 km || multiple || 2002–2021 || 14 Jan 2021 || 126 || align=left | Disc.: NEATAlt.: 2013 PQ26 || 
|- id="2002 NU82" bgcolor=#E9E9E9
| 0 ||  || MBA-M || 17.5 || data-sort-value="0.94" | 940 m || multiple || 2002–2018 || 05 Aug 2018 || 72 || align=left | Disc.: NEATAlt.: 2016 AR81 || 
|- id="2002 NV82" bgcolor=#fefefe
| 0 ||  || MBA-I || 18.63 || data-sort-value="0.56" | 560 m || multiple || 2002–2021 || 06 Apr 2021 || 47 || align=left | Disc.: NEAT || 
|- id="2002 NX82" bgcolor=#E9E9E9
| 2 ||  || MBA-M || 18.6 || data-sort-value="0.57" | 570 m || multiple || 2002–2019 || 27 Nov 2019 || 48 || align=left | Disc.: NEAT || 
|- id="2002 NY82" bgcolor=#fefefe
| 0 ||  || MBA-I || 18.29 || data-sort-value="0.65" | 650 m || multiple || 2002–2021 || 25 Sep 2021 || 92 || align=left | Disc.: NEATAlt.: 2010 VR116 || 
|- id="2002 NB83" bgcolor=#E9E9E9
| 3 ||  || MBA-M || 17.4 || data-sort-value="0.98" | 980 m || multiple || 2002–2015 || 04 Dec 2015 || 26 || align=left | Disc.: NEAT || 
|- id="2002 ND83" bgcolor=#d6d6d6
| 0 ||  || MBA-O || 16.51 || 2.8 km || multiple || 2002–2021 || 08 May 2021 || 165 || align=left | Disc.: NEATAlt.: 2012 MK12, 2015 BF31 || 
|- id="2002 NE83" bgcolor=#E9E9E9
| 2 ||  || MBA-M || 17.7 || data-sort-value="0.86" | 860 m || multiple || 2002–2019 || 07 Oct 2019 || 30 || align=left | Disc.: NEAT || 
|- id="2002 NG83" bgcolor=#d6d6d6
| 0 ||  || MBA-O || 15.94 || 3.6 km || multiple || 2002–2021 || 02 May 2021 || 198 || align=left | Disc.: NEATAlt.: 2010 AK12, 2016 EE69 || 
|- id="2002 NH83" bgcolor=#E9E9E9
| 0 ||  || MBA-M || 17.4 || 1.4 km || multiple || 2002–2019 || 27 Aug 2019 || 103 || align=left | Disc.: NEATAlt.: 2011 RZ3 || 
|- id="2002 NL83" bgcolor=#E9E9E9
| 0 ||  || MBA-M || 17.18 || 1.1 km || multiple || 1994–2021 || 17 Apr 2021 || 155 || align=left | Disc.: NEATAlt.: 2015 YP12 || 
|- id="2002 NM83" bgcolor=#E9E9E9
| 1 ||  || MBA-M || 18.0 || data-sort-value="0.75" | 750 m || multiple || 2002–2020 || 21 Jan 2020 || 49 || align=left | Disc.: NEATAlt.: 2014 OE380 || 
|- id="2002 NO83" bgcolor=#FA8072
| 0 ||  || MCA || 18.4 || data-sort-value="0.62" | 620 m || multiple || 2002–2020 || 14 Feb 2020 || 87 || align=left | Disc.: NEAT || 
|- id="2002 NP83" bgcolor=#E9E9E9
| 1 ||  || MBA-M || 18.4 || data-sort-value="0.88" | 880 m || multiple || 2002–2019 || 24 Oct 2019 || 69 || align=left | Disc.: NEAT || 
|- id="2002 NS83" bgcolor=#d6d6d6
| 0 ||  || MBA-O || 16.8 || 2.4 km || multiple || 2002–2019 || 06 Oct 2019 || 81 || align=left | Disc.: LPL/Spacewatch II || 
|- id="2002 NT83" bgcolor=#d6d6d6
| 0 ||  || MBA-O || 16.2 || 3.2 km || multiple || 2002–2021 || 18 Jan 2021 || 118 || align=left | Disc.: NEAT || 
|- id="2002 NU83" bgcolor=#fefefe
| 0 ||  || MBA-I || 18.4 || data-sort-value="0.62" | 620 m || multiple || 2002–2020 || 17 Jun 2020 || 59 || align=left | Disc.: LPL/Spacewatch II || 
|- id="2002 NV83" bgcolor=#fefefe
| 0 ||  || MBA-I || 18.21 || data-sort-value="0.68" | 680 m || multiple || 2002–2021 || 11 Nov 2021 || 67 || align=left | Disc.: NEAT || 
|- id="2002 NW83" bgcolor=#fefefe
| 0 ||  || MBA-I || 18.4 || data-sort-value="0.62" | 620 m || multiple || 2002–2021 || 12 Jan 2021 || 94 || align=left | Disc.: Kitt Peak Obs. || 
|- id="2002 NX83" bgcolor=#fefefe
| 0 ||  || MBA-I || 18.2 || data-sort-value="0.68" | 680 m || multiple || 2002–2017 || 22 Oct 2017 || 40 || align=left | Disc.: LPL/Spacewatch II || 
|- id="2002 NY83" bgcolor=#d6d6d6
| 0 ||  || MBA-O || 16.8 || 2.4 km || multiple || 2002–2021 || 18 Jan 2021 || 75 || align=left | Disc.: LPL/Spacewatch II || 
|- id="2002 NZ83" bgcolor=#d6d6d6
| 0 ||  || MBA-O || 17.0 || 2.2 km || multiple || 2002–2019 || 04 Dec 2019 || 57 || align=left | Disc.: LPL/Spacewatch II || 
|- id="2002 NA84" bgcolor=#E9E9E9
| 0 ||  || MBA-M || 17.5 || data-sort-value="0.94" | 940 m || multiple || 2002–2020 || 09 Dec 2020 || 66 || align=left | Disc.: LPL/Spacewatch II || 
|- id="2002 NC84" bgcolor=#d6d6d6
| 0 ||  || MBA-O || 16.8 || 2.4 km || multiple || 2002–2019 || 19 Dec 2019 || 41 || align=left | Disc.: LPL/Spacewatch II || 
|- id="2002 ND84" bgcolor=#d6d6d6
| 0 ||  || MBA-O || 17.4 || 1.8 km || multiple || 2002–2019 || 24 Oct 2019 || 37 || align=left | Disc.: LPL/Spacewatch II || 
|- id="2002 NE84" bgcolor=#fefefe
| 0 ||  || MBA-I || 18.6 || data-sort-value="0.57" | 570 m || multiple || 2002–2021 || 14 May 2021 || 67 || align=left | Disc.: LPL/Spacewatch IIAlt.: 2010 RC124 || 
|- id="2002 NF84" bgcolor=#E9E9E9
| 0 ||  || MBA-M || 18.2 || data-sort-value="0.96" | 960 m || multiple || 2002–2019 || 29 Sep 2019 || 32 || align=left | Disc.: LPL/Spacewatch IIAdded on 22 July 2020 || 
|}
back to top

O 

|- id="2002 OF5" bgcolor=#fefefe
| 2 ||  || MBA-I || 18.0 || data-sort-value="0.94" | 750 m || multiple || 2002-2022 || 04 Jan 2022 || 35 || align=left | Disc.: NEAT || 
|- id="2002 OR5" bgcolor=#E9E9E9
| 0 ||  || MBA-M || 16.9 || 1.8 km || multiple || 2002–2019 || 25 Oct 2019 || 168 || align=left | Disc.: NEAT || 
|- id="2002 OP6" bgcolor=#d6d6d6
| 0 ||  || MBA-O || 16.23 || 3.2 km || multiple || 2002–2021 || 31 Oct 2021 || 230 || align=left | Disc.: NEATAlt.: 2012 TY151 || 
|- id="2002 OU7" bgcolor=#FA8072
| 0 ||  || MCA || 19.44 || data-sort-value="0.38" | 380 m || multiple || 2002–2021 || 06 Nov 2021 || 70 || align=left | Disc.: NEAT || 
|- id="2002 OX8" bgcolor=#d6d6d6
| 0 ||  || MBA-O || 16.1 || 3.4 km || multiple || 2002–2021 || 15 Jan 2021 || 152 || align=left | Disc.: NEAT || 
|- id="2002 OZ8" bgcolor=#FA8072
| 0 ||  || MCA || 18.2 || data-sort-value="0.68" | 680 m || multiple || 2002–2019 || 20 Dec 2019 || 108 || align=left | Disc.: NEATAlt.: 2012 PB6 || 
|- id="2002 OL15" bgcolor=#d6d6d6
| 4 ||  || MBA-O || 18.5 || 1.1 km || single || 68 days || 29 Aug 2002 || 38 || align=left | Disc.: LINEAR || 
|- id="2002 OB19" bgcolor=#E9E9E9
| 0 ||  || MBA-M || 17.6 || 1.3 km || multiple || 2002–2019 || 26 Nov 2019 || 267 || align=left | Disc.: NEAT || 
|- id="2002 OE19" bgcolor=#d6d6d6
| 0 ||  || MBA-O || 16.41 || 2.9 km || multiple || 2002–2021 || 09 Nov 2021 || 133 || align=left | Disc.: NEAT || 
|- id="2002 OB20" bgcolor=#d6d6d6
| 0 ||  || MBA-O || 16.0 || 3.5 km || multiple || 2002–2021 || 16 Jan 2021 || 209 || align=left | Disc.: NEAT || 
|- id="2002 OJ20" bgcolor=#E9E9E9
| 0 ||  || MBA-M || 17.3 || 1.5 km || multiple || 2002–2019 || 31 Aug 2019 || 151 || align=left | Disc.: NEAT || 
|- id="2002 OJ21" bgcolor=#FA8072
| 1 ||  || MCA || 18.1 || data-sort-value="0.71" | 710 m || multiple || 2002–2017 || 27 Mar 2017 || 86 || align=left | Disc.: NEAT || 
|- id="2002 OW21" bgcolor=#FA8072
| 0 ||  || HUN || 18.43 || data-sort-value="0.61" | 610 m || multiple || 2002–2020 || 21 Jun 2020 || 53 || align=left | Disc.: NEATAlt.: 2005 YW283 || 
|- id="2002 OX21" bgcolor=#FA8072
| 4 ||  || MCA || 19.2 || data-sort-value="0.80" | 800 m || single || 68 days || 21 Sep 2002 || 37 || align=left | Disc.: NEAT || 
|- id="2002 OY21" bgcolor=#FFC2E0
| 0 ||  || APO || 20.73 || data-sort-value="0.25" | 250 m || multiple || 2002–2021 || 03 Aug 2021 || 70 || align=left | Disc.: NEAT || 
|- id="2002 OS22" bgcolor=#E9E9E9
| 0 ||  || MBA-M || 16.2 || 2.4 km || multiple || 2002–2020 || 22 Dec 2020 || 315 || align=left | Disc.: LINEAR || 
|- id="2002 OF23" bgcolor=#E9E9E9
| 0 ||  || MBA-M || 16.99 || 1.7 km || multiple || 1998–2021 || 22 Jan 2021 || 210 || align=left | Disc.: NEATAlt.: 2011 WL131 || 
|- id="2002 OO23" bgcolor=#d6d6d6
| 0 ||  || MBA-O || 16.1 || 3.4 km || multiple || 2002–2019 || 24 Dec 2019 || 105 || align=left | Disc.: NEAT || 
|- id="2002 OV23" bgcolor=#fefefe
| 0 ||  || MBA-I || 17.5 || data-sort-value="0.94" | 940 m || multiple || 2002–2021 || 18 Jan 2021 || 199 || align=left | Disc.: NEAT || 
|- id="2002 OG24" bgcolor=#E9E9E9
| 0 ||  || MBA-M || 17.1 || 1.6 km || multiple || 2002–2021 || 07 Jan 2021 || 139 || align=left | Disc.: NEAT || 
|- id="2002 OH24" bgcolor=#d6d6d6
| 1 ||  || MBA-O || 16.6 || 2.7 km || multiple || 2002–2019 || 29 Oct 2019 || 80 || align=left | Disc.: NEAT || 
|- id="2002 OW24" bgcolor=#fefefe
| 0 ||  || MBA-I || 18.5 || data-sort-value="0.59" | 590 m || multiple || 2002–2021 || 09 Jun 2021 || 110 || align=left | Disc.: NEAT || 
|- id="2002 OC25" bgcolor=#E9E9E9
| 0 ||  || MBA-M || 18.0 || data-sort-value="0.75" | 750 m || multiple || 2002–2019 || 31 Oct 2019 || 62 || align=left | Disc.: NEATAlt.: 2014 KS52 || 
|- id="2002 ON25" bgcolor=#d6d6d6
| 0 ||  || MBA-O || 16.5 || 2.8 km || multiple || 2002–2020 || 10 Dec 2020 || 84 || align=left | Disc.: NEAT || 
|- id="2002 OT25" bgcolor=#E9E9E9
| 2 ||  || MBA-M || 18.1 || data-sort-value="0.71" | 710 m || multiple || 2002–2018 || 15 Apr 2018 || 44 || align=left | Disc.: NEAT || 
|- id="2002 OX25" bgcolor=#E9E9E9
| 0 ||  || MBA-M || 17.22 || 1.2 km || multiple || 2002–2022 || 27 Jan 2022 || 84 || align=left | Disc.: NEAT || 
|- id="2002 OL26" bgcolor=#fefefe
| 0 ||  || MBA-I || 19.30 || data-sort-value="0.41" | 410 m || multiple || 2002–2021 || 30 Nov 2021 || 48 || align=left | Disc.: NEAT || 
|- id="2002 OT26" bgcolor=#E9E9E9
| 0 ||  || MBA-M || 17.34 || 1.0 km || multiple || 2002–2021 || 07 Apr 2021 || 144 || align=left | Disc.: NEAT || 
|- id="2002 OW26" bgcolor=#d6d6d6
| 0 ||  || MBA-O || 16.4 || 2.9 km || multiple || 2002–2019 || 01 Nov 2019 || 83 || align=left | Disc.: NEAT || 
|- id="2002 OA27" bgcolor=#d6d6d6
| 0 ||  || MBA-O || 16.5 || 2.8 km || multiple || 2002–2019 || 29 Sep 2019 || 78 || align=left | Disc.: NEAT || 
|- id="2002 OS27" bgcolor=#E9E9E9
| 1 ||  || MBA-M || 17.79 || data-sort-value="0.86" | 860 m || multiple || 2002-2022 || 24 Jul 2022 || 52 || align=left | Disc.: NEATAlt.: 2010 GQ17 || 
|- id="2002 OH28" bgcolor=#E9E9E9
| 0 ||  || MBA-M || 17.5 || data-sort-value="0.94" | 940 m || multiple || 2002–2019 || 29 Nov 2019 || 130 || align=left | Disc.: NEAT || 
|- id="2002 OJ28" bgcolor=#fefefe
| 1 ||  || MBA-I || 18.9 || data-sort-value="0.49" | 490 m || multiple || 2002–2021 || 19 May 2021 || 39 || align=left | Disc.: NEATAlt.: 2012 TW189 || 
|- id="2002 OK28" bgcolor=#d6d6d6
| 0 ||  || MBA-O || 16.4 || 2.9 km || multiple || 2002–2020 || 01 Jan 2020 || 71 || align=left | Disc.: NEAT || 
|- id="2002 OT28" bgcolor=#FA8072
| 1 ||  || MCA || 18.5 || data-sort-value="0.59" | 590 m || multiple || 2002–2019 || 05 Nov 2019 || 42 || align=left | Disc.: NEATAlt.: 2012 QX20 || 
|- id="2002 OW28" bgcolor=#d6d6d6
| 0 ||  || MBA-O || 17.1 || 2.1 km || multiple || 2002–2019 || 08 Nov 2019 || 66 || align=left | Disc.: NEAT || 
|- id="2002 OJ29" bgcolor=#d6d6d6
| 0 ||  || MBA-O || 16.0 || 3.5 km || multiple || 2002–2021 || 11 Jun 2021 || 154 || align=left | Disc.: NEATAlt.: 2015 DC94 || 
|- id="2002 OL29" bgcolor=#fefefe
| 0 ||  || MBA-I || 18.12 || data-sort-value="0.71" | 710 m || multiple || 2002–2022 || 24 Jan 2022 || 104 || align=left | Disc.: NEAT || 
|- id="2002 OM29" bgcolor=#fefefe
| 0 ||  || MBA-I || 18.4 || data-sort-value="0.62" | 620 m || multiple || 1996–2020 || 22 Feb 2020 || 129 || align=left | Disc.: NEAT || 
|- id="2002 OO29" bgcolor=#E9E9E9
| 0 ||  || MBA-M || 17.0 || 1.2 km || multiple || 2002–2021 || 10 Jan 2021 || 85 || align=left | Disc.: NEATAlt.: 2015 TX306 || 
|- id="2002 OP29" bgcolor=#d6d6d6
| 0 ||  || HIL || 15.4 || 4.9 km || multiple || 2002–2021 || 15 Jan 2021 || 88 || align=left | Disc.: NEATAlt.: 2010 KY25 || 
|- id="2002 OQ29" bgcolor=#d6d6d6
| 0 ||  || MBA-O || 15.7 || 4.0 km || multiple || 1999–2021 || 09 Jan 2021 || 247 || align=left | Disc.: NEATAlt.: 2013 RL15 || 
|- id="2002 OU29" bgcolor=#E9E9E9
| 0 ||  || MBA-M || 17.80 || 1.5 km || multiple || 2002–2021 || 28 Nov 2021 || 62 || align=left | Disc.: NEATAlt.: 2011 OW27 || 
|- id="2002 OS30" bgcolor=#E9E9E9
| 0 ||  || MBA-M || 16.98 || 1.2 km || multiple || 2002–2021 || 07 Apr 2021 || 70 || align=left | Disc.: NEAT || 
|- id="2002 OW30" bgcolor=#d6d6d6
| 0 ||  || MBA-O || 16.0 || 3.5 km || multiple || 2002–2021 || 16 Jan 2021 || 193 || align=left | Disc.: NEATAlt.: 2013 QP12 || 
|- id="2002 OZ30" bgcolor=#d6d6d6
| 0 ||  || MBA-O || 16.1 || 3.4 km || multiple || 2002–2019 || 20 Dec 2019 || 131 || align=left | Disc.: NEAT || 
|- id="2002 OP31" bgcolor=#d6d6d6
| 0 ||  || MBA-O || 16.7 || 2.5 km || multiple || 2002–2020 || 19 Dec 2020 || 56 || align=left | Disc.: NEAT || 
|- id="2002 OT31" bgcolor=#fefefe
| 0 ||  || MBA-I || 18.04 || data-sort-value="0.73" | 730 m || multiple || 2002–2021 || 31 Mar 2021 || 102 || align=left | Disc.: NEATAlt.: 2011 CV61 || 
|- id="2002 OV31" bgcolor=#fefefe
| 1 ||  || HUN || 18.3 || data-sort-value="0.65" | 650 m || multiple || 2002–2020 || 08 Oct 2020 || 114 || align=left | Disc.: NEAT || 
|- id="2002 OX31" bgcolor=#E9E9E9
| 2 ||  || MBA-M || 17.8 || 1.2 km || multiple || 2002–2015 || 06 Sep 2015 || 24 || align=left | Disc.: NEAT || 
|- id="2002 OY31" bgcolor=#fefefe
| 1 ||  || MBA-I || 18.5 || data-sort-value="0.59" | 590 m || multiple || 2002–2019 || 21 Sep 2019 || 49 || align=left | Disc.: NEAT || 
|- id="2002 OB32" bgcolor=#d6d6d6
| 0 ||  || MBA-O || 16.46 || 2.8 km || multiple || 2002–2021 || 06 Apr 2021 || 105 || align=left | Disc.: NEAT || 
|- id="2002 OC32" bgcolor=#fefefe
| 0 ||  || MBA-I || 18.8 || data-sort-value="0.52" | 520 m || multiple || 2002–2018 || 16 May 2018 || 42 || align=left | Disc.: NEAT || 
|- id="2002 OE32" bgcolor=#E9E9E9
| 3 ||  || MBA-M || 18.0 || 1.1 km || multiple || 2002–2019 || 02 Oct 2019 || 25 || align=left | Disc.: NEAT || 
|- id="2002 OL32" bgcolor=#E9E9E9
| 2 ||  || MBA-M || 17.5 || data-sort-value="0.94" | 940 m || multiple || 2002–2020 || 03 Jan 2020 || 40 || align=left | Disc.: NEAT || 
|- id="2002 OS32" bgcolor=#E9E9E9
| 0 ||  || MBA-M || 17.9 || 1.1 km || multiple || 2002–2020 || 14 Nov 2020 || 95 || align=left | Disc.: NEAT || 
|- id="2002 OT32" bgcolor=#d6d6d6
| 0 ||  || MBA-O || 16.68 || 2.6 km || multiple || 2002–2021 || 17 Apr 2021 || 147 || align=left | Disc.: NEATAlt.: 2007 RR279 || 
|- id="2002 OW32" bgcolor=#d6d6d6
| 0 ||  || MBA-O || 15.91 || 3.7 km || multiple || 2002–2020 || 14 Nov 2020 || 226 || align=left | Disc.: NEATAlt.: 2008 WM122, 2015 BT207 || 
|- id="2002 OD33" bgcolor=#fefefe
| 0 ||  || MBA-I || 19.1 || data-sort-value="0.45" | 450 m || multiple || 2002–2020 || 15 Oct 2020 || 60 || align=left | Disc.: NEAT || 
|- id="2002 OO33" bgcolor=#fefefe
| 0 ||  || MBA-I || 18.27 || data-sort-value="0.66" | 660 m || multiple || 2002–2021 || 25 Sep 2021 || 160 || align=left | Disc.: NEATAlt.: 2015 TV165 || 
|- id="2002 OP33" bgcolor=#E9E9E9
| 0 ||  || MBA-M || 16.9 || 1.2 km || multiple || 2002–2020 || 28 Jan 2020 || 109 || align=left | Disc.: NEAT || 
|- id="2002 OB34" bgcolor=#d6d6d6
| 0 ||  || MBA-O || 16.7 || 2.5 km || multiple || 2002–2019 || 24 Oct 2019 || 52 || align=left | Disc.: NEAT || 
|- id="2002 OC34" bgcolor=#E9E9E9
| 0 ||  || MBA-M || 18.4 || data-sort-value="0.88" | 880 m || multiple || 2002–2019 || 29 Sep 2019 || 50 || align=left | Disc.: NEAT || 
|- id="2002 OF34" bgcolor=#d6d6d6
| 0 ||  || MBA-O || 16.52 || 2.8 km || multiple || 2002–2021 || 11 Apr 2021 || 103 || align=left | Disc.: NEATAlt.: 2012 LF13 || 
|- id="2002 OR34" bgcolor=#E9E9E9
| 0 ||  || MBA-M || 17.2 || 1.1 km || multiple || 2001–2021 || 18 Jan 2021 || 106 || align=left | Disc.: NEATAlt.: 2007 WR36 || 
|- id="2002 OS34" bgcolor=#fefefe
| 0 ||  || MBA-I || 18.09 || data-sort-value="0.72" | 720 m || multiple || 2002–2021 || 31 Aug 2021 || 52 || align=left | Disc.: NEAT || 
|- id="2002 OU34" bgcolor=#E9E9E9
| 1 ||  || MBA-M || 18.0 || 1.1 km || multiple || 2002–2015 || 02 Nov 2015 || 59 || align=left | Disc.: NEATAlt.: 2015 OS65 || 
|- id="2002 OW34" bgcolor=#d6d6d6
| 0 ||  || MBA-O || 17.07 || 2.1 km || multiple || 2002–2021 || 14 May 2021 || 109 || align=left | Disc.: NEAT || 
|- id="2002 OX34" bgcolor=#fefefe
| 0 ||  || MBA-I || 18.52 || data-sort-value="0.59" | 590 m || multiple || 2002–2021 || 14 May 2021 || 105 || align=left | Disc.: NEATAlt.: 2006 QV156 || 
|- id="2002 OB35" bgcolor=#fefefe
| 2 ||  || MBA-I || 18.5 || data-sort-value="0.59" | 590 m || multiple || 2001–2014 || 28 Oct 2014 || 34 || align=left | Disc.: NEATAlt.: 2010 RF106 || 
|- id="2002 OD35" bgcolor=#fefefe
| 0 ||  || MBA-I || 19.0 || data-sort-value="0.47" | 470 m || multiple || 2002–2020 || 20 Oct 2020 || 97 || align=left | Disc.: NEAT || 
|- id="2002 OE35" bgcolor=#E9E9E9
| 0 ||  || MBA-M || 17.7 || data-sort-value="0.86" | 860 m || multiple || 2002–2019 || 02 Nov 2019 || 73 || align=left | Disc.: NEAT || 
|- id="2002 OG35" bgcolor=#E9E9E9
| 3 ||  || MBA-M || 19.5 || data-sort-value="0.37" | 370 m || multiple || 2001–2006 || 21 Jul 2006 || 21 || align=left | Disc.: NEAT || 
|- id="2002 OJ35" bgcolor=#d6d6d6
| 0 ||  || MBA-O || 16.13 || 3.3 km || multiple || 2002–2021 || 08 May 2021 || 203 || align=left | Disc.: NEATAlt.: 2002 PH202 || 
|- id="2002 OK35" bgcolor=#fefefe
| 1 ||  || MBA-I || 18.9 || data-sort-value="0.49" | 490 m || multiple || 2002–2020 || 23 Oct 2020 || 76 || align=left | Disc.: NEAT || 
|- id="2002 OM35" bgcolor=#fefefe
| 0 ||  || MBA-I || 18.6 || data-sort-value="0.57" | 570 m || multiple || 2002–2021 || 10 Jan 2021 || 72 || align=left | Disc.: NEAT || 
|- id="2002 OO35" bgcolor=#fefefe
| 0 ||  || MBA-I || 17.40 || data-sort-value="0.98" | 980 m || multiple || 2002–2021 || 08 Jul 2021 || 155 || align=left | Disc.: NEATAlt.: 2011 YP19 || 
|- id="2002 OP35" bgcolor=#E9E9E9
| 2 ||  || MBA-M || 17.8 || data-sort-value="0.82" | 820 m || multiple || 2002–2019 || 14 Nov 2019 || 74 || align=left | Disc.: NEAT || 
|- id="2002 OT35" bgcolor=#E9E9E9
| 0 ||  || MBA-M || 18.0 || 1.4 km || multiple || 2002–2016 || 25 Nov 2016 || 81 || align=left | Disc.: NEAT || 
|- id="2002 OZ35" bgcolor=#fefefe
| 0 ||  || MBA-I || 17.7 || data-sort-value="0.86" | 860 m || multiple || 1996–2020 || 22 Apr 2020 || 205 || align=left | Disc.: NEATAlt.: 2010 RS140 || 
|- id="2002 OB36" bgcolor=#fefefe
| 2 ||  || MBA-I || 18.3 || data-sort-value="0.65" | 650 m || multiple || 2002–2020 || 14 Nov 2020 || 161 || align=left | Disc.: NEAT || 
|- id="2002 OC36" bgcolor=#E9E9E9
| 0 ||  || MBA-M || 17.5 || 1.3 km || multiple || 2002–2021 || 03 Jan 2021 || 75 || align=left | Disc.: NEATAlt.: 2006 KW112 || 
|- id="2002 OE36" bgcolor=#d6d6d6
| 0 ||  || MBA-O || 16.02 || 3.5 km || multiple || 2002–2021 || 13 May 2021 || 212 || align=left | Disc.: NEAT || 
|- id="2002 OF36" bgcolor=#fefefe
| 0 ||  || MBA-I || 18.98 || data-sort-value="0.48" | 480 m || multiple || 2002–2021 || 11 Jun 2021 || 82 || align=left | Disc.: NEATAlt.: 2008 GM76 || 
|- id="2002 OH36" bgcolor=#fefefe
| 0 ||  || MBA-I || 17.53 || data-sort-value="0.93" | 930 m || multiple || 2002–2021 || 03 Aug 2021 || 190 || align=left | Disc.: NEAT || 
|- id="2002 OL36" bgcolor=#E9E9E9
| 0 ||  || MBA-M || 17.1 || 2.1 km || multiple || 2002–2020 || 05 Nov 2020 || 136 || align=left | Disc.: NEATAlt.: 2011 QJ53 || 
|- id="2002 ON36" bgcolor=#E9E9E9
| 0 ||  || MBA-M || 17.0 || 1.7 km || multiple || 2002–2020 || 11 Dec 2020 || 121 || align=left | Disc.: NEATAlt.: 2009 CQ4 || 
|- id="2002 OO36" bgcolor=#E9E9E9
| 0 ||  || MBA-M || 17.05 || 1.6 km || multiple || 2002–2022 || 10 Jan 2022 || 136 || align=left | Disc.: NEATAlt.: 2010 PB26 || 
|- id="2002 OS36" bgcolor=#fefefe
| 0 ||  || MBA-I || 18.5 || data-sort-value="0.59" | 590 m || multiple || 2002–2020 || 14 Sep 2020 || 101 || align=left | Disc.: NEATAlt.: 2006 WC81 || 
|- id="2002 OW36" bgcolor=#E9E9E9
| 0 ||  || MBA-M || 17.2 || 1.1 km || multiple || 1998–2020 || 01 Jan 2020 || 63 || align=left | Disc.: NEAT || 
|- id="2002 OX36" bgcolor=#E9E9E9
| 0 ||  || MBA-M || 17.38 || data-sort-value="0.99" | 990 m || multiple || 1998–2021 || 01 Apr 2021 || 119 || align=left | Disc.: NEAT || 
|- id="2002 OZ36" bgcolor=#E9E9E9
| 0 ||  || MBA-M || 18.2 || data-sort-value="0.68" | 680 m || multiple || 2002–2019 || 26 Oct 2019 || 69 || align=left | Disc.: NEAT || 
|- id="2002 OB37" bgcolor=#fefefe
| 0 ||  || MBA-I || 17.53 || data-sort-value="0.93" | 930 m || multiple || 2002–2022 || 27 Jan 2022 || 281 || align=left | Disc.: NEAT || 
|- id="2002 OC37" bgcolor=#fefefe
| 0 ||  || MBA-I || 18.5 || data-sort-value="0.59" | 590 m || multiple || 2002–2021 || 15 Jan 2021 || 52 || align=left | Disc.: NEAT || 
|- id="2002 OD37" bgcolor=#E9E9E9
| 0 ||  || MBA-M || 18.1 || 1.0 km || multiple || 2002–2020 || 17 Oct 2020 || 63 || align=left | Disc.: NEAT || 
|- id="2002 OE37" bgcolor=#d6d6d6
| 0 ||  || MBA-O || 16.8 || 2.4 km || multiple || 2002–2020 || 02 Apr 2020 || 116 || align=left | Disc.: NEAT || 
|- id="2002 OG37" bgcolor=#fefefe
| 2 ||  || MBA-I || 18.8 || data-sort-value="0.52" | 520 m || multiple || 2002–2020 || 27 Jun 2020 || 24 || align=left | Disc.: NEAT || 
|- id="2002 OH37" bgcolor=#E9E9E9
| 0 ||  || MBA-M || 17.2 || 1.5 km || multiple || 2002–2021 || 18 Jan 2021 || 142 || align=left | Disc.: NEATAlt.: 2015 TJ307 || 
|- id="2002 OJ37" bgcolor=#E9E9E9
| 0 ||  || MBA-M || 17.9 || 1.1 km || multiple || 2002–2019 || 04 Jul 2019 || 47 || align=left | Disc.: NEATAlt.: 2015 RR146 || 
|- id="2002 OK37" bgcolor=#d6d6d6
| 0 ||  || MBA-O || 16.5 || 2.8 km || multiple || 2001–2020 || 14 Sep 2020 || 72 || align=left | Disc.: NEAT || 
|- id="2002 OL37" bgcolor=#fefefe
| 0 ||  || MBA-I || 17.0 || 1.2 km || multiple || 2002–2021 || 11 Jan 2021 || 325 || align=left | Disc.: NEATAlt.: 2006 WQ190 || 
|- id="2002 OM37" bgcolor=#fefefe
| 0 ||  || MBA-I || 17.8 || data-sort-value="0.82" | 820 m || multiple || 1999–2021 || 04 Jan 2021 || 168 || align=left | Disc.: NEATAlt.: 2006 WD79 || 
|- id="2002 OP37" bgcolor=#d6d6d6
| 0 ||  || MBA-O || 16.7 || 2.5 km || multiple || 2002–2019 || 20 Dec 2019 || 110 || align=left | Disc.: NEAT || 
|- id="2002 OR37" bgcolor=#fefefe
| 2 ||  || MBA-I || 18.8 || data-sort-value="0.52" | 520 m || multiple || 2002–2016 || 25 Oct 2016 || 57 || align=left | Disc.: NEATAlt.: 2016 QS2 || 
|- id="2002 OU37" bgcolor=#fefefe
| 0 ||  || MBA-I || 18.86 || data-sort-value="0.50" | 500 m || multiple || 2002–2021 || 31 Oct 2021 || 106 || align=left | Disc.: NEAT || 
|- id="2002 OW37" bgcolor=#E9E9E9
| 2 ||  || MBA-M || 17.2 || 1.1 km || multiple || 2002–2020 || 04 Jan 2020 || 41 || align=left | Disc.: AMOSAlt.: 2013 ER72 || 
|- id="2002 OX37" bgcolor=#d6d6d6
| 0 ||  || MBA-O || 16.6 || 2.7 km || multiple || 1991–2020 || 11 Dec 2020 || 64 || align=left | Disc.: NEAT || 
|- id="2002 OA38" bgcolor=#E9E9E9
| 0 ||  || MBA-M || 17.3 || 1.9 km || multiple || 1997–2020 || 11 Aug 2020 || 113 || align=left | Disc.: NEAT || 
|- id="2002 OB38" bgcolor=#d6d6d6
| 0 ||  || MBA-O || 16.52 || 2.8 km || multiple || 2002–2022 || 25 Jan 2022 || 52 || align=left | Disc.: NEAT || 
|- id="2002 OC38" bgcolor=#E9E9E9
| 0 ||  || MBA-M || 17.0 || 1.7 km || multiple || 2002–2020 || 14 Oct 2020 || 133 || align=left | Disc.: NEATAlt.: 2015 MV94 || 
|- id="2002 OD38" bgcolor=#E9E9E9
| 0 ||  || MBA-M || 17.2 || 1.5 km || multiple || 2002–2021 || 12 Jan 2021 || 161 || align=left | Disc.: NEAT || 
|- id="2002 OE38" bgcolor=#E9E9E9
| 0 ||  || MBA-M || 17.6 || data-sort-value="0.90" | 900 m || multiple || 2002–2019 || 28 Nov 2019 || 49 || align=left | Disc.: NEAT || 
|- id="2002 OG38" bgcolor=#E9E9E9
| 0 ||  || MBA-M || 17.02 || 1.7 km || multiple || 1999–2022 || 07 Jan 2022 || 170 || align=left | Disc.: SpacewatchAlt.: 1999 XJ224, 2007 TY263 || 
|- id="2002 OH38" bgcolor=#d6d6d6
| 3 ||  || MBA-O || 17.2 || 2.0 km || multiple || 2002–2018 || 13 Aug 2018 || 23 || align=left | Disc.: NEAT || 
|- id="2002 OK38" bgcolor=#d6d6d6
| 0 ||  || MBA-O || 16.66 || 2.6 km || multiple || 2002–2021 || 17 Apr 2021 || 75 || align=left | Disc.: NEAT || 
|- id="2002 OL38" bgcolor=#E9E9E9
| 2 ||  || MBA-M || 19.0 || data-sort-value="0.67" | 670 m || multiple || 2002–2019 || 25 Sep 2019 || 35 || align=left | Disc.: NEAT || 
|- id="2002 OM38" bgcolor=#E9E9E9
| 0 ||  || MBA-M || 17.9 || data-sort-value="0.78" | 780 m || multiple || 2002–2019 || 28 Nov 2019 || 45 || align=left | Disc.: NEAT || 
|- id="2002 ON38" bgcolor=#fefefe
| 1 ||  || MBA-I || 18.7 || data-sort-value="0.54" | 540 m || multiple || 2002–2020 || 21 Sep 2020 || 84 || align=left | Disc.: NEAT || 
|- id="2002 OO38" bgcolor=#d6d6d6
| 0 ||  || MBA-O || 17.0 || 2.2 km || multiple || 1992–2018 || 18 Oct 2018 || 66 || align=left | Disc.: NEAT || 
|- id="2002 OP38" bgcolor=#d6d6d6
| 0 ||  || MBA-O || 16.2 || 3.2 km || multiple || 2002–2020 || 30 Jan 2020 || 81 || align=left | Disc.: NEAT || 
|- id="2002 OR38" bgcolor=#E9E9E9
| 0 ||  || MBA-M || 17.2 || 1.5 km || multiple || 2002–2021 || 17 Jan 2021 || 82 || align=left | Disc.: NEAT || 
|- id="2002 OS38" bgcolor=#E9E9E9
| 0 ||  || MBA-M || 17.3 || 1.5 km || multiple || 2002–2019 || 26 Oct 2019 || 91 || align=left | Disc.: NEATAlt.: 2010 CM266, 2010 PL39 || 
|- id="2002 OT38" bgcolor=#fefefe
| 3 ||  || MBA-I || 18.6 || data-sort-value="0.57" | 570 m || multiple || 2002–2019 || 07 Apr 2019 || 35 || align=left | Disc.: NEATAlt.: 2002 NT82 || 
|}
back to top

References 
 

Lists of unnumbered minor planets